= Western Kentucky Hilltoppers football statistical leaders =

The Western Kentucky Hilltoppers football statistical leaders are individual statistical leaders of the Western Kentucky Hilltoppers football program in various categories, including passing, rushing, receiving, total offense, defensive stats, and kicking. Within those areas, the lists identify single-game, single-season, and career leaders. The Hilltoppers represent Western Kentucky University (WKU) in the NCAA's Conference USA (C-USA) in the Football Bowl Subduvision (FBS) of Division I.

Although Western Kentucky began competing in intercollegiate football in 1908, the school's official record book considers the "modern era" to have begun the 1950s. Records from before this decade are often incomplete and inconsistent, and they are generally not included in these lists.

These lists are dominated by more recent players for several reasons:

- Since 1951, seasons have increased from 10 games to 11 and then 12 games in length.
- C-USA has held a championship game since 2005. Since joining the league in 2014, WKU has appeared in three title games, winning in 2015 and 2016 and losing in 2021.
- The NCAA didn't allow freshmen to play varsity football until 1972 (with the exception of the World War II years), allowing players to have four-year careers.
- Postseason games only began counting toward single-season and career statistics in 2002. Since then, the Hilltoppers have appeared the FCS Playoffs three times and in eight bowl games.
- Due to COVID-19, the NCAA declared that the 2020 season would not count against any player's athletic eligibility, thus giving anyone who appeared in a game during that season five years of eligibility instead of the standard four.

These lists are updated through the 2025 season.

== Passing ==
=== Passing yards ===
Career
Rank	Player	Yards	Years
1	Brandon Doughty	12,855	2011 2012 2013 2014 2015
2	Jeff Cesarone	8,566	1984 1985 1986 1987
3	Mike White	8,540	2016 2017
4	Austin Reed	8,084	2022 2023
5	Justin Haddix	7,929	2003 2004 2005 2006
6	Kawaun Jakes	7,538	2009 2010 2011 2012
7	Bailey Zappe	5,967 (Note: Zappe began his college career at Houston Baptist in 2017, redshirting that season before playing three seasons. He transferred to Western after graduating from HBU in 2021.)	2021
8	Johnny Vance	4,046	1966 1967 1968 1969
9	John Hall	3,876	1977 1978 1979 1980
10	Jimmy Feix	3,780	1949 1950 1951 1952

Single season
Rank	Player	Yards	Year
1	Bailey Zappe	5,967	2021
2	Brandon Doughty	5,055	2015
3	Brandon Doughty	4,830	2014
4	Austin Reed	4,744	2022
5	Mike White	4,363	2016
6	Mike White	4,177	2017
7	Austin Reed	3,340	2023
8	Caden Veltkamp	3,108	2024
9	Brandon Doughty	2,857	2013
10	Jeff Cesarone	2,737	1985

Single game
Rank	Player	Yards	Year	Opponent
1	Brandon Doughty	593	2014	Middle Tennessee
2	Bailey Zappe	577	2021	UTSA (C-USA Championship Game)
3	Brandon Doughty	569	2014	Bowling Green
4	Bailey Zappe	523	2021	UTSA (Note: This was the regularly scheduled game between the two teams. They also played in the 2021 C-USA championship game.)
5	Mike White	517	2016	Rice
6	Austin Reed	497	2022	South Alabama
7	Jeff Cesarone	494	1985	Akron
8	Brandon Doughty	491	2014	Marshall
9	Bailey Zappe	488	2021	Michigan State
10	Brandon Doughty	486	2014	Central Michigan (Bahamas Bowl)

=== Passing touchdowns ===
Career
Rank	Player	TDs	Years
1	Brandon Doughty	111	2011 2012 2013 2014 2015
2	Austin Reed	71	2022 2023
3	Mike White	63	2016 2017
4	Bailey Zappe	62	2021
5	Kawaun Jakes	51	2009 2010 2011 2012
6	Justin Haddix	50	2003 2004 2005 2006
7	Jeff Cesarone	46	1984 1985 1986 1987
8	Leo Peckenpaugh	35	1970 1971 1972 1973
9	Jimmy Feix	30	1949 1950 1951 1952
	John Hall	30	1977 1978 1979 1980
	Willie Taggart	30	1995 1996 1997 1998
	Caden Veltkamp	30	2022 2023 2024

Single season
Rank	Player	TDs	Year
1	Bailey Zappe	62	2021
2	Brandon Doughty	49	2014
3	Brandon Doughty	48	2015
4	Austin Reed	40	2022
5	Mike White	37	2016
6	Austin Reed	31	2023
7	Mike White	26	2017
8	Caden Veltkamp	25	2024
9	Kawaun Jakes	22	2012
10	Jeff Cesarone	18	1985

Single game
Rank	Player	TDs	Year	Opponent
1	Brandon Doughty	8	2014	Marshall
2	Bailey Zappe	7	2021	UT Martin
3	Brandon Doughty	6	2014	Bowling Green
	Brandon Doughty	6	2015	Miami (Ohio)
	Bailey Zappe	6	2021	Florida Atlantic
	Bailey Zappe	6	2021	Appalachian State (Boca Raton Bowl)
	Austin Reed	6	2022	Charlotte
8	15 times by 8 players	5	Most recent: Maverick McIvor, 2025 vs. North Alabama	

== Rushing ==
=== Rushing yards ===
Career
Rank	Player	Yards	Years
1	Bobby Rainey	4,542	2008 2009 2010 2011
2	Lerron Moore	4,396	2003 2004 2005 2006
3	Willie Taggart	3,997	1995 1996 1997 1998
4	Antwan Floyd	3,775	1993 1994 1995 1996
5	Antonio Andrews	3,674	2010 2011 2012 2013
6	Joe Arnold	3,570	1985 1986 1987 1988
7	Dickie Moore	3,560	1965 1966 1967 1968
8	Anthony Wales	3,342	2013 2014 2015 2016
9	Clarence Jackson	2,584	1970 1971 1972 1973
10	Jimmy Woods	2,479	1975 1976 1977 1978

Single season
Rank	Player	Yards	Year
1	Antonio Andrews	1,730	2013
2	Antonio Andrews	1,728	2012
3	Bobby Rainey	1,695	2011
4	Joe Arnold	1,668	1988
5	Bobby Rainey	1,649	2010
6	Anthony Wales	1,621	2016
7	Leon Allen	1,542	2014
8	Jon Frazier	1,537	2002
9	Lerron Moore	1,490	2003
10	Dickie Moore	1,444	1967

Single game
Rank	Player	Yards	Year	Opponent
1	Leon Allen	345	2014	Army
2	Eddie Thompson	309	1992	Southern Illinois
3	Clarence Jackson	297	1971	Butler
4	Willie Taggart	289	1997	Southern Illinois
5	Joe Arnold	260	1987	North Carolina A&T
6	Rod Smart	258	1999	Eastern Illinois

=== Rushing touchdowns ===
Career
Rank	Player	TDs	Years
1	Willie Taggart	47	1995 1996 1997 1998
2	Lerron Moore	43	2003 2004 2005 2006
	Anthony Wales	43	2013 2014 2015 2016
4	Clarence Jackson	37	1970 1971 1972 1973
5	Bobby Rainey	35	2008 2009 2010 2011
6	Dickie Moore	34	1965 1966 1967 1968
7	Antonio Andrews	29	2010 2011 2012 2013
8	Joe Arnold	28	1985 1986 1987 1988
9	Antwan Floyd	27	1993 1994 1995 1996
10	Latravis Powell	24	1994 1995 1996 1997

Single season
Rank	Player	TDs	Year
1	Anthony Wales	27	2016
2	Dickie Moore	19	1967
3	Willie Taggart	16	1997
	Antonio Andrews	16	2013
5	Willie Taggart	15	1998
	Bobby Rainey	15	2010
7	Joe Arnold	14	1988
	Jason Michael	14	2002
	Brian Porter	14	2004
10	Lerron Moore	13	2003
	Bobby Rainey	13	2011
	Leon Allen	13	2014

Single game
Rank	Player	TDs	Year	Opponent
1	Antonio Andrews	5	2013	Morgan State
2	5 times	4	Most recent: Anthony Wales, 2016 vs. Louisiana Tech	

== Receiving ==
=== Receptions ===
Career
Rank	Player	Rec	Years
1	Malachi Corley	259	2020 2021 2022 2023
2	Taywan Taylor	253	2013 2014 2015 2016
3	Lucky Jackson	210	2016 2017 2018 2019
4	Nicholas Norris	194	2013 2014 2015 2016
5	Willie McNeal	171	2010 2012 2013 2014
6	Jake Gaebler	168	2006 2007 2008 2009
7	Jack Doyle	162	2009 2010 2011 2012
8	Jared Dangerfield	151	2014 2015
9	Jerreth Sterns	150 (Note: Sterns began his college career at Houston Baptist in 2018, playing three seasons before transferring to Western.)	2021
10	Curtis Hamilton	149	2004 2005 2006 2007

Single season
Rank	Player	Rec	Year
1	Jerreth Sterns	150	2021
2	Malachi Corley	101	2022
3	Taywan Taylor	98	2016
4	Lucky Jackson	94	2019
5	Mitchell Tinsley	87	2021
6	Taywan Taylor	86	2015
7	Jared Dangerfield	82	2015
8	Malachi Corley	79	2023
9	Nicholas Norris	76	2016
	Jahcour Pearson	76	2019

Single game
Rank	Player	Rec	Year	Opponent
1	Lucky Jackson	17	2019	Western Michigan (First Responder Bowl)
	Jerreth Sterns	17	2021	Michigan State
3	Lucky Jackson	16	2019	Marshall
	Jerreth Sterns	16	2021	UTSA
5	Jay Davis	15	1969	Akron
6	Jerreth Sterns	14	2021	FIU
7	Jerreth Sterns	13	2021	Old Dominion
	Jerreth Sterns	13	2021	Appalachian State (Boca Raton Bowl)
9	Pat McKenzie	12	1984	Eastern Illinois
	Curtis Hamilton	12	2007	Eastern Kentucky
	Taywan Taylor	12	2014	Bowling Green
	Taywan Taylor	12	2016	Middle Tennessee
	Jerreth Sterns	12	2021	Florida Atlantic
	Daewood Davis	12	2022	Troy

=== Receiving yards ===
Career
Rank	Player	Yards	Years
1	Taywan Taylor	4,234	2013 2014 2015 2016
2	Nicholas Norris	3,091	2013 2014 2015 2016
3	Malachi Corley	3,033	2020 2021 2022 2023
4	Lucky Jackson	2,691	2016 2017 2018 2019
5	Curtis Hamilton	2,324	2004 2005 2006 2007
6	Jay Davis	2,236	1968 1969 1970 1971
7	Willie McNeal	2,181	2010 2012 2013 2014
8	Keith Paskett	2,117	1983 1984 1985 1986
9	Eddie Preston	2,083	1976 1977 1978 1979
10	Joey Stockton	2,057	1995 1996 1997

Single season
Rank	Player	Yards	Year
1	Jerreth Sterns	1,902	2021
2	Taywan Taylor	1,730	2016
3	Taywan Taylor	1,467	2015
4	Mitchell Tinsley	1,402	2021
5	Nicholas Norris	1,318	2016
6	Malachi Corley	1,293	2022
7	Lucky Jackson	1,133	2019
8	Porter Williams	1,107	1973
9	Malachi Corley	984	2023
10	Nicholas Norris	971	2015

Single game
Rank	Player	Yards	Year	Opponent
1	Joey Stockton	276	1995	Austin Peay
2	Jerreth Sterns	221	2021	Old Dominion
3	Malachi Corley	207	2023	Louisiana Tech
4	Mitchell Tinsley	198	2021	Rice
5	Taywan Taylor	197	2016	Middle Tennessee
6	Taywan Taylor	196	2015	Indiana
7	Jerreth Sterns	195	2021	UTSA
8	Joey Stockton	194	1997	Murray State
	Taywan Taylor	194	2016	Louisiana Tech (C-USA Championship)
	Lucky Jackson	194	2019	Florida Atlantic

=== Receiving touchdowns ===
Career
Rank	Player	TDs	Years
1	Taywan Taylor	41	2013 2014 2015 2016
2	Malachi Corley	29	2020 2021 2022 2023
3	Nicholas Norris	26	2013 2014 2015 2016
4	Eddie Preston	22	1976 1977 1978 1979
5	Porter Williams	21	1970 1971 1972 1973
	Willie McNeal	21	2010 2012 2013 2014
	Dalvin Smith	21	2020 2021 2022 2023 2024
8	Jay Davis	19	1968 1969 1970
	Curtis Hamilton	19	2004 2005 2006 2007
	Jared Dangerfield	19	2014 2015

Single season
Rank	Player	TDs	Year
1	Taywan Taylor	17	2015
	Taywan Taylor	17	2016
	Jerreth Sterns	17	2021
4	Nicholas Norris	14	2016
	Mitchell Tinsley	14	2021
6	Porter Williams	11	1973
	Jared Dangerfield	11	2014
	Malachi Corley	11	2022
	Malachi Corley	11	2023
10	Curtis Hamilton	10	2006

Single game
Rank	Player	TDs	Year	Opponent
1	Porter Williams	4	1973	Murray State
2	Porter Williams	3	1971	East Tennessee State
	Eddie Preston	3	1978	Morehead State
	Tyler Higbee	3	2014	Marshall
	Taywan Taylor	3	2015	Middle Tennessee
	Nicholas Norris	3	2016	Louisiana Tech
	Taywan Taylor	3	2016	Old Dominion
	Taywan Taylor	3	2016	North Texas
	Jerreth Sterns	3	2021	Appalachian State (Boca Raton Bowl)
	Malachi Corley	3	2022	Austin Peay
	Malachi Corley	3	2023	Louisiana Tech
	Dalvin Smith	3	2023	Old Dominion

== Total offense ==
Total offense is the sum of passing and rushing statistics. It does not include receiving or returns.

=== Total offense yards ===
Career
Rank	Player	Yards	Years
1	Brandon Doughty	12,570	2011 2012 2013 2014 2015
2	Justin Haddix	8,890	2003 2004 2005 2006
3	Austin Reed	8,408	2022 2023
4	Willie Taggart	7,223	1995 1996 1997 1998
5	Jeff Cesarone	7,852	1984 1985 1986 1987
6	Kawaun Jakes	8,323	2009 2010 2011 2012
7	Bailey Zappe	5,984	2021
8	Johnny Vance	4,782	1966 1967 1968 1969
9	Bobby Rainey	4,595	2008 2009 2010 2011
10	Lerron Moore	4,334	2003 2004 2005 2006

Single season
Rank	Player	Yards	Year
1	Bailey Zappe	5,984	2021
2	Austin Reed	4,968	2022
3	Brandon Doughty	4,933	2015
4	Brandon Doughty	4,778	2014
5	Mike White	4,289	2016
6	Austin Reed	3,440	2023
7	Caden Veltkamp	3,258	2024
8	Brandon Doughty	2,478	2013
9	Kawaun Jakes	2,546	2012
10	Jeff Cesarone	2,542	1985

Single game
Rank	Player	Yards	Year	Opponent
1	Bailey Zappe	582	2021	UTSA (C-USA Championship Game)
2	Brandon Doughty	579	2014	Middle Tennessee
3	Brandon Doughty	567	2014	Bowling Green
4	Bailey Zappe	525	2021	UTSA
5	Austin Reed	522	2022	South Alabama
6	Mike White	517	2016	Rice
7	Brandon Doughty	495	2015	Indiana
8	Brandon Doughty	490	2014	Central Michigan (Bahamas Bowl)
9	Jeff Cesarone	484	1985	Akron
10	Bailey Zappe	477	2021	Rice

=== Touchdowns responsible for ===
"Touchdowns responsible for" is the NCAA's official term for combined passing and rushing touchdowns. Note that Western's most recent (2021) football media guide does not list leaders in this statistic over any time frame, though past media guides have done so.

Career
Rank	Player	TDs	Years
1	Brandon Doughty	114	2011 2012 2013 2014 2015
	Austin Reed	83	2022 2023
3	Willie Taggart	77	1995 1996 1997 1998
4	Justin Haddix	70	2003 2004 2005 2006
5	Kawaun Jakes	65	2009 2010 2011 2012
	Bailey Zappe	65	2021
7	Jeff Cesarone	48	1984 1985 1986 1987
	Mike White	48	2016
9	Lerron Moore	43	2003 2004 2005 2006
	Anthony Wales	43	2013 2014 2015 2016

Single season
Rank	Player	TDs	Year
1	Bailey Zappe	65	2021
2	Brandon Doughty	51	2014
3	Brandon Doughty	49	2015
4	Mike White	48	2016
	Austin Reed	48	2022
6	Austin Reed	35	2023
7	Caden Veltkamp	32	2024
8	Willie Taggart	27	1997
	Anthony Wales	27	2016
10	Kawaun Jakes	25	2012

Single game
Rank	Player	TDs	Year	Opponent
1	Brandon Doughty	8	2014	Marshall
2	Bailey Zappe	7	2021	UT Martin
3	Brandon Doughty	6	2014	Bowling Green
	Brandon Doughty	6	2015	Miami (Ohio)
	Bailey Zappe	6	2021	Florida Atlantic
	Bailey Zappe	6	2021	Appalachian State (Boca Raton Bowl)
	Austin Reed	6	2022	Charlotte
	Caden Veltkamp	6	2024	Middle Tennessee

== Defense ==
=== Interceptions ===
Career
Rank	Player	Ints	Years
1	Bobby Sippio	19	1999 2000 2001
2	Delvechio Walls	14	1995 1996 1997 1998
3	James Edwards	13	1984 1985 1986 1987
4	Antonio Thomas	12	2002 2003 2004 2005
5	Reginald Johnson	11	1979 1980 1981 1983
	Cam Thomas	11	2011 2012 2013 2014
7	Barry Bumm	10	1978 1979 1980 1981
8	Jeremy Chandler	9	2000 2001 2002 2003
	Jonathan Dowling	9	2012 2013
10	Vernard Johnson	8	1984 1985 1986
	Joseph Jefferson	8	1988 1989 1990 1991

Single season
Rank	Player	Ints	Year
1	Bobby Sippio	10	2000
2	James Edwards	7	1987
	Antonio Thomas	7	2004
4	Joseph Jefferson	6	2000
	Jonathan Dowling	6	2012
6	Carl Brazley	5	1978
	Reginald Johnson	5	1981
	Hayes Thomas	5	2000
	Bobby Sippio	5	2001
	Jeremy Chandler	5	2002
	Bo Smith	5	2007
	Cam Thomas	5	2013

Single game
Rank	Player	Ints	Year	Opponent
1	Jim Pickens	4	1948	Eastern Kentucky
2	Max Stevens	3	1951	Morehead State
	Jon Leathers	3	1974	Dayton
	Carl Brazley	3	1978	East Tennessee State
	Jonathan Dowling	3	2012	Kentucky
	Branden Leston	3	2014	Marshall

=== Tackles ===
Career
Rank	Player	Tackles	Years
1	Rick Green	525	1972 1973 1974 1975
2	Paul Gray	488	1980 1981 1982 1983
3	Erik Dandy	422	2000 2001 2002 2003
4	Charles Thompson	411	2001 2002 2003 2004
5	Biff Madon	401	1974 1975 1976 1977
6	Melvin Wisham	394	1997 1998 1999 2000
7	Tony Towns	370	1974 1976 1977 1978
8	Carl Estelle	355	1976 1977 1978 1979
9	Bill Hape	354	1967 1968 1969 1970
10	Devon Key	350	2017 2018 2019 2020
	DeAngelo Malone	350	2017 2018 2019 2020 2021

Single season
Rank	Player	Tackles	Year
1	Rick Green	213	1975
2	Paul Gray	173	1981
3	Melvin Wishman	171	2000
4	Erik Dandy	165	2003
5	Charles Thompson	159	2002
6	Richard Grice	156	1992
7	Erik Dandy	155	2001
8	Paul Grant	149	1982
9	Biff Madon	148	1976
10	Biff Madon	143	1977

=== Sacks ===
Career
Rank	Player	Sacks	Years
1	DeAngelo Malone	34.0	2017 2018 2019 2020 2021
2	Sherrod Coates	30.0	1999 2000 2001 2002
3	Quanterus Smith	24.0	2009 2010 2011 2012
4	Jon Drummond	21.0	1999 2000 2001 2002
5	Ben Witman	20.5	1996 1997 1998 1999
6	Juwuan Jones	19.5	2018 2019 2020 2021 2022
7	Sean Longstreth	18.0	1994 1995 1996 1997
8	Xavier Jordan	14.0	1985 1986 1987 1988
	Ben Mooney	14.0	1990 1991 1992 1993
	Bryan Heyward	14.0	1995 1996 1997 1998
	Brandon Smith	14.0	2003 2004 2005

Single season
Rank	Player	Sacks	Year
1	Sherrod Coates	13.0	2002
2	Quanterus Smith	12.5	2012
3	DeAngelo Malone	11.5	2019
4	Ben Witman	10.5	1999
5	Ben Mooney	9.0	1993
	Sean Longstreth	9.0	1997
	Karl Maslowski	9.0	2003
	Brandon Smith	9.0	2003
	DeAngelo Malone	9.0	2021
	JaQues Evans	9.0	2022

== Kicking ==
=== Field goals made ===
Career
Rank	Player	FGs	Years
1	Garrett Schwettman	54	2012 2013 2014 2015
2	Chris James	51	2004 2005 2006 2007
	Brayden Narveson	51 (Note: Narveson began his college career at Iowa State in 2019, transferring to Western Kentucky after that season.)	2020 2021 2022
4	Peter Martinez	49	2000 2001 2002
5	Dan Maher	47	1985 1986 1987 1988
6	Jeff Poisel	31	1996 1997 1998 1999
7	Lucas Carneiro	27	2023 2024
8	Matt Lange	23	2002 2003
9	Cory Munson	20	2019 2020 2021 2022 2023
10	Jim Griffiths	19	1980 1981 1982

Single season
Rank	Player	FGs	Year
1	Matt Lange	23	2003
	Brayden Narveson	23	2021
3	Peter Martinez	18	2002
	Lucas Carneiro	18	2024
5	Peter Martinez	17	2000
	Cory Munson	17	2019
7	Garrett Schwettman	16	2014
	Skyler Simcox	16	2016
9	Dan Maher	15	1988
	Chris James	15	2005
	Garrett Schwettman	15	2015
	Brayden Narveson	15	2022
	John Cannon	15	2025

Single game
Rank	Player	FGs	Year	Opponent
1	Matt Lange	5	2003	Eastern Kentucky
2	Steve Donisi	4	1990	Eastern Kentucky
	Chris Pino	4	1993	Jacksonville State
	Casey Tinius	4	2009	Louisiana-Monroe
	Garrett Schwettman	4	2015	Louisiana Tech
	Brayden Narveson	4	2021	Marshall
	Lucas Carneiro	4	2024	Jacksonville State

=== Field goal percentage ===
Minimum of 20 career attempts and 10 single-season attempts.

Career
Rank	Player	FG%	Years
1	Lucas Carneiro	87.1%	2023 2024
2	Matt Lange	82.1%	2002 2003
3	Garrett Schwettman	81.8%	2012 2013 2014 2015
4	Brayden Narveson	79.7%	2020 2021 2022
5	Chris James	76.1%	2004 2005 2006 2007
6	Skyler Simcox	72.7%	2016
7	Peter Martinez	71.0%	2000 2001 2002
8	Dan Maher	64.4%	1985 1986 1987 1988
9	Chris Pino	63.0%	1990 1991 1992 1993
10	Cory Munson	62.5%	2019 2020 2021 2022 2023

Single season
Rank	Player	FG%	Year
1	Lucas Carneiro	94.7%	2024
2	Garrett Schwettman	93.8%	2015
3	Brayden Narveson	92.9%	2020
4	Chris Pino	92.3%	1993
5	Will Sweeney	90.0%	1994
6	Chris James	88.2%	2005
7	Matt Lange	82.1%	2003
8	Garrett Schwettman	81.3%	2013
9	Brayden Narveson	79.3%	2021
10	John Cannon	78.9%	2025
