= List of Western Kentucky Hilltoppers in the NFL draft =

This is a list of Western Kentucky University Hilltoppers football players in the NFL draft.

== Key ==
B	Back	K	Kicker	NT	Nose tackle
C	Center	LB	Linebacker	FB	Fullback
DB	Defensive back	P	Punter	HB	Halfback
DE	Defensive end	QB	Quarterback	WR	Wide receiver
DT	Defensive tackle	RB	Running back	G	Guard
E	End	T	Offensive tackle	TE	Tight end

== Selections ==
Year	Round	Pick	Overall	Player	Team	Position
1950	12	7	151	Frank Wallheiser	Chicago Cardinals	E
1956	28	4	329	Bill Strawn	Philadelphia Eagles	LB
1958	20	12	241	Bill Curry	Detroit Lions	T
1965	7	13	97	Dale Lindsey	Cleveland Browns	LB
1965	10	8	134	Jim Burt	Los Angeles Rams	RB
1971	15	14	378	Bill Green	Cleveland Browns	DB
1971	16	17	407	Lawrence Brame	St. Louis Cardinals	LB
1971	17	16	432	Sam Pearson	Cincinnati Bengals	DB
1973	8	4	186	Isaac Brown	New England Patriots	RB
1974	8	1	183	Mike McCoy	Houston Oilers	DB
1974	16	5	395	Clarence Jackson	New York Jets	RB
1975	4	5	83	Virgil Livers	Chicago Bears	DB
1975	8	2	184	John Bushong	Baltimore Colts	DE
1976	13	13	360	Rick Caswell	New York Giants	WR
1977	6	26	165	David Carter	Houston Oilers	C
1980	11	24	301	Eddie Preston	Houston Oilers	WR
1982	11	1	280	Lamont Meacham	Baltimore Colts	DB
1983	8	21	217	Davlin Mullen	New York Jets	DB
1984	10	12	264	Paul Gray	New Orleans Saints	LB
1988	8	14	207	David Smith	Philadelphia Eagles	RB
1990	10	21	269	Jerome Martin	Green Bay Packers	DB
1990	11	11	287	Webbie Burnett	New Orleans Saints	DT
1992	12	13	321	Milton Biggins	Miami Dolphins	TE
2002	3	9	74	Joseph Jefferson	Indianapolis Colts	DB
2002	5	15	150	Mel Mitchell	New Orleans Saints	DB
2003	4	21	118	Jeremi Johnson	Cincinnati Bengals	FB
2013	5	13	146	Quanterus Smith	Denver Broncos	DE
2014	6	27	203	Andrew Jackson	Indianapolis Colts	LB
2014	7	32	247	Jonathan Dowling	Oakland Raiders	DB
2016	4	12	110	Tyler Higbee	Los Angeles Rams	TE
2016	7	2	223	Brandon Doughty	Miami Dolphins	QB
2016	7	28	249	Prince Charles Iworah	San Francisco 49ers	DB
2017	2	6	38	Forrest Lamp	Los Angeles Chargers	G
2017	3	8	72	Taywan Taylor	Tennessee Titans	WR
2018	4	15	115	Joel Iyiegbuniwe	Chicago Bears	LB
2018	5	34	171	Mike White	Dallas Cowboys	QB
2022	3	18	82	DeAngelo Malone	Atlanta Falcons	LB
2022	4	32	137	Bailey Zappe	New England Patriots	QB
2023	3	33	96	Brodric Martin	Detroit Lions	DT
2024	3	1	65	Malachi Corley	New York Jets	WR
2025	3	36	100	Upton Stout	San Francisco 49ers	CB
