= Kawaun Jakes =

American football player (born 1990)

Profile
- Position: Quarterback

Personal information
- Born: February 28, 1990 (age 36)
- Listed height: 6 ft 3 in (1.91 m)
- Listed weight: 195 lb (88 kg)

Career information
- High school: St. Augustine (St. Augustine, Florida)
- College: Western Kentucky (2008–2012)
- NFL draft: 2013: undrafted

Career history
- Jacksonville Jaguars (2013)*
- * Offseason or practice squad member only

Kawaun Jamale Jakes (born February 28, 1990) is an American former football quarterback. He played college football for the Western Kentucky Hilltoppers.

== Early life ==
Jakes attended St. Augustine High School in St. Augustine, Florida. As a senior, he threw for more than 2,200 yards and 24 touchdowns. Following his graduation, Jakes committed to play college football at Western Kentucky University.

== College career ==
After redshirting in 2008, Jakes made his first career start against Navy on September 26, 2009, after starter Brandon Smith suffered a shoulder injury. He completed 22 of 28 pass attempts for 276 yards, two touchdowns, and two interceptions while rushing for 44 yards and another touchdown in a 38–22 loss. In 2009, Jakes played in 11 games, making eight starts, and passed for 1,516 yards while accounting for 14 total touchdowns. Prior to the 2010 season, Jakes sustained an ankle injury while playing pickup basketball. Despite the injury, he was named the Hilltoppers' starting quarterback. Jakes started all 12 games in 2010, throwing for 1,680 yards, 10 touchdowns, and six interceptions. He retained the starting quarterback job entering the 2011 season. After throwing four interceptions in the season opener against Kentucky and struggling against Navy the following week, Jakes was benched in favor of Brandon Doughty. Doughty started the following game against Indiana State but suffered a season-ending knee injury after three plays. Jakes entered in relief and threw for 237 yards, two touchdowns, and one interception in the 44–16 loss. Against rival Middle Tennessee, he threw for 222 yards and the game-winning touchdown in the second overtime to lead Western Kentucky to a 36–33 victory. Jakes finished the 2011 season passing for 1,854 yards, 10 touchdowns, and 12 interceptions. Against Kentucky in 2012, Jakes led the Hilltoppers to a 32–31 overtime victory, successfully executing a trick play on the game-winning two-point conversion. He finished his final season with 2,488 passing yards and 22 touchdowns.

Following the conclusion of his college football career, Jakes joined the Hilltoppers basketball team due to a shortage of players. He appeared in two games without recording any statistics before leaving the program.

=== Statistics ===
College statistics
Season	Team	Games			Passing								Rushing			
Season	Team	GP	GS	Record	Cmp	Att	Pct	Yds	Avg	TD	Int	Rtg	Att	Yds	Avg	TD
2008	Western Kentucky	Redshirted (redshirt)														
2009	Western Kentucky	11	8	0–8	148	244	60.7	1,516	6.2	9	9	117.6	125	362	2.9	5
2010	Western Kentucky	12	12	2–10	149	291	51.2	1,680	5.8	10	6	106.9	96	210	2.2	4
2011	Western Kentucky	12	11	7–4	153	276	55.4	1,854	6.7	10	12	115.1	72	161	2.2	2
2012	Western Kentucky	13	13	7–6	200	312	64.1	2,488	8.0	22	11	147.3	66	58	0.9	3
Career		48	44	16−28	650	1,123	57.9	7,538	6.7	51	38	122.5	359	791	2.2	14

== Professional career ==
After going undrafted in the 2013 NFL draft, Jakes attended rookie mini-camp with the Jacksonville Jaguars.
