= Kolby Smith =

American football player and coach (born 1984)

Kentucky Wildcats
- Title: Running backs coach

Personal information
- Born: December 15, 1984 (age 41); Tallahassee, Florida, U.S.

Career information
- High school: James S. Rickards (Tallahassee, Florida)
- College: Louisville
- NFL draft: 2007: 5th round, 148th overall pick

Career history

Playing
- Kansas City Chiefs (2007–2009); Denver Broncos (2010)*; Jacksonville Jaguars (2010)*
- * Offseason or practice squad member only

Coaching
- Arkansas (2012) Graduate assistant; Western Kentucky (2013) Running backs coach; Louisville (2014–2018) Running backs coach; Rutgers (2019) Running backs coach; Miami Dolphins (2020–2021) Offensive quality control coach; Miami Dolphins (2022–2023) Offensive assistant; Arkansas (2024–2025) Running backs coach; Kentucky (2026–present) Running backs coach

Career NFL statistics
- Rushing attempts: 162
- Rushing yards: 540
- Rushing touchdowns: 3
- Receptions: 34
- Receiving yards: 209
- Stats at Pro Football Reference

Kolby Kendrall Smith (born December 15, 1984) is an American former professional football running back and current coach who is the running backs coach for Kentucky of the NCAA Division I Football Bowl Subdivision (FBS). He was selected by the Kansas City Chiefs in the fifth round of the 2007 NFL draft after he played college football at Louisville. Smith was also a member of the Denver Broncos and Jacksonville Jaguars. After his playing career he began coaching in the college ranks and as 2020 he returned to the NFL as a coach with the Dolphins. He became the runnings backs coach for Arkansas in 2024. On September 28, 2025, Arkansas head coach Sam Pittman was fired. On September 29, 2025, Smith was named the interim offensive coordinator for Arkansas by interim head coach Bobby Petrino.

== Early life ==
Smith attended James S. Rickards High School in Tallahassee, Florida, where he was a two-sport star, excelling in football and track. As a junior, he finished ninth at the Florida state track meet in the 110 metre hurdles. On the football field, Smith earned team MVP, first-team All-District and Honorable Mention All-State honors during his junior and senior campaigns. After starting at fullback as a sophomore, blocking for All-American running back Michael Fisher who ran for more than 2,000 yards and 30 scores, Smith played on both sides of the ball as a junior, notching 105 tackles, four sacks and two forced fumbles while also rushing for 947 yards and 10 touchdowns on 88 carries. In his senior year, he tallied over 1,300 yards and 11 touchdowns, earning first-team All-Big Bend Area honors.

Considered a three-star recruit by Rivals.com, Smith was listed as the No. 66 prospect from Florida in the class of 2003. He chose Louisville over Indiana.

== College career ==
In his true freshman season at Louisville, Smith appeared in 12 games and rushed 18 times for 131 yards and one touchdown. Splitting carries with junior Lionel Gates and sophomore Eric Shelton, Smith averaged a team-best 7.3 yards a carry. His first career touchdown came in the regular-season finale against Cincinnati.

As a sophomore, Smith appeared in 10 games and rushed 37 times for 347 yards and four touchdowns, averaging 9.4 yards per rush. His best game of the season again came versus Cincinnati, as he scored a career-high three touchdowns.

Although Gates and Shelton had left for the 2005 NFL draft, Smith spent the 2005 season as backup to Michael Bush. While Bush led the NCAA in scoring, Smith ranked third on the team in rushing with 523 yards and six touchdowns, averaging 4.9 yards per carry.

Expected to play a backup role again in 2006, Smith became the starting tailback after Bush suffered a season-ending injury to his tibia. Smith rushed for 697 yards on 126 carries, averaging 5.5 yards per carry, and scoring five touchdowns. In his best game of the season, he scored two touchdowns, rushing for 165 yards on 16 carries, versus Syracuse.

== Professional career ==
=== Pre-draft ===
At the 2006 Senior Bowl, Smith was not able to impress scouts, instead "looking like an ordinary ball carrier".

Pre-draft measurables
Height	Weight	40-yard dash	10-yard split	20-yard split	20-yard shuttle	Three-cone drill	Vertical jump	Broad jump	Bench press
5 ft 11 1/8 in (1.81 m)	220 lb (100 kg)	4.50 s	1.53 s	2.59 s	4.34 s	7.22 s	38 in (0.97 m)	9 ft 6 in (2.90 m)	18 reps
All values from NFL Combine

=== Kansas City Chiefs ===
Smith was selected in the fifth round (148th overall) in the 2007 NFL draft by the Kansas City Chiefs. He was signed to a three-year contract on June 22, 2007.

His first career NFL start was on November 25, 2007, due to injuries to Larry Johnson and the retirement of Priest Holmes. He recorded his first career touchdown on that date against the Oakland Raiders at Arrowhead Stadium in Kansas City.

On December 5, 2009, he was placed on Injured Reserve due to an ankle injury.

He was re-signed by the Chiefs on February 24, 2010.

The Chiefs waived Smith on June 14, 2010.

=== Denver Broncos ===
The Denver Broncos were assigned Smith off waivers on June 15, 2010. He was waived on August 4.

=== Jacksonville Jaguars ===
Smith was signed by the Jacksonville Jaguars on August 25, 2010. He was waived on September 3.

== Coaching career ==
=== College ===
In 2012, Smith began his coaching career as the graduate assistant at Arkansas. In 2013, he joined the Western Kentucky football program as tailbacks coach. WKU's head coach Bobby Petrino was the head coach of Louisville when Smith played for the Cardinals. In January 2014, Smith was brought along to Louisville and became the running back coach for Louisville under new/old Head Coach Bobby Petrino. After Petrino was fired in 2018, Smith spent the 2019 season coaching running backs at Rutgers he however wasn't retained by the newly hired Greg Schiano for the 2020 season. He became the runnings backs coach for Arkansas in 2024. On September 28, 2025, Arkansas head coach Sam Pittman was fired. On September 29, 2025, Smith was named the interim offensive coordinator for Arkansas by interim head coach Bobby Petrino.

=== NFL ===
On June 13, 2020, it was announced that Smith would be an offensive quality control coach for the Miami Dolphins. He missed the team's weeks 9 and 10 games against the Arizona Cardinals and Los Angeles Chargers on November 8 and November 15, 2020, in accordance with COVID-19 protocols.

== Personal life ==
Smith is a cousin of Mike Brown, a strong safety who spent most of his NFL career with the Chicago Bears. He majored in Sports Administration at Louisville.
