= 2015 Miami Beach Bowl =

- 2nd Miami Beach Bowl
Western Kentucky Hilltoppers	South Florida Bulls
(11–2)	(8–4)
C-USA	The American
45	35
Head coach: Jeff Brohm	Head coach: Willie Taggart
AP 25
	1	2	3	4	Total
Western Kentucky	0	10	28	7	45
South Florida	7	7	7	14	35
- Date: December 21, 2015
- Season: 2015
- Stadium: Marlins Park
- Location: Miami, Florida
- MVP: Western Kentucky QB Brandon Doughty
- Favorite: W. Kentucky by 3½
- Referee: Greg Blum (MAC)
- Attendance: 21,712
- Payout: US$1,000,000

United States TV coverage
- Network: ESPN/Touchdown Radio
- Announcers: Dave LaMont, Desmond Howard, & Quint Kessenich (ESPN); Taylor Zarzour & Gino Torretta (Touchdown)

The 2015 Miami Beach Bowl was a post-season American college football bowl game played on December 21, 2015 at Marlins Park in Miami, Florida. The second edition of the Miami Beach Bowl featured the champions from Conference USA, the Western Kentucky Hilltoppers against the South Florida Bulls of the American Athletic Conference. It began at 2:30 p.m. EST and air on ESPN. It was one of the 2015–16 bowl games that concluded the 2015 FBS football season.

== Teams ==
The game featured the Western Kentucky Hilltoppers against the South Florida Bulls. It was the seventh overall meeting between these two teams, with South Florida leading the series 4–2 before this game. The last meeting between these two teams was in 2010, when the Bulls beat the Hilltoppers 24–12 in Tampa.

=== South Florida Bulls ===
Sources told ESPN reporter Brett McMurphy that the Bulls had officially been invited to the game and accepted.

This was the Bulls' seventh bowl game (they were previously 4–2 all-time in bowl games) and their first since winning the 2010 Meineke Car Care Bowl over Clemson by a score of 31–26. It was also the Bulls' first bowl game in Florida since winning the 2008 St. Petersburg Bowl (said game's inaugural edition) over Memphis by a score of 41–14.

== Game summary ==
=== Scoring Summary ===
Scoring summary

Quarter	Time	Drive			Team	Scoring information	Score	
Quarter	Time	Plays	Yards	TOP	Team	Scoring information	WKU	USF
1	5:21	5	62	1:54	USF	Quinton Flowers 12-yard touchdown run, Emilio Nadelman kick good	0	7
2	12:18	5	47	2:03	USF	Rodney Adams 34-yard touchdown run, Emilio Nadelman kick good	0	14
2	6:17	2	66	0:38	WKU	Anthony Wales 13-yard touchdown run, Garrett Schwettman kick good	7	14
2	0:00	7	34	1:06	WKU	39-yard field goal by Garrett Schwettman	10	14
3	9:43	3	75	0:40	WKU	Nicholas Norris 69-yard touchdown reception from Brandon Doughty, Garrett Schwettman kick good	17	14
3	7:46	3	67	1:01	WKU	Nicholas Norris 55-yard touchdown reception from Brandon Doughty, Garrett Schwettman kick good	24	14
3	4:55	8	92	2:51	USF	Tyre McCants 34-yard touchdown reception from D'Ernest Johnson, Emilio Nadelman kick good	24	21
3	1:56	7	69	2:59	WKU	Nacarius Fant 9-yard touchdown run, Garrett Schwettman kick good	31	21
3	0:05	1	26	0:06	WKU	Jared Dangerfield 26-yard touchdown reception from Brandon Doughty, Garrett Schwettman kick good	38	21
4	14:53	2	82	0:12	USF	Rodney Adams 53-yard touchdown reception from Quinton Flowers, Emilio Nadelman kick good	38	28
4	11:00	6	75	2:09	USF	Quinton Flowers 8-yard touchdown run, Emilio Nadelman kick good	38	35
4	5:09	2	64	0:49	WKU	Anthony Wales 42-yard touchdown run, Garrett Schwettman kick good	45	35
"TOP" = time of possession. For other American football terms, see Glossary of American football.							45	35

=== Statistics ===
Statistics	WKU	USF
First downs	27	28
Plays–yards	79–612	79–597
Rushes–yards	33–151	45–290
Passing yards	461	307
Passing: Comp–Att–Int	32–46–2	15–34–0
Time of possession	31:28	28:32

Team	Category	Player	Statistics
WKU	Passing	Brandon Doughty	32/44, 461 yds, 3 TD, 2 INT
WKU	Rushing	Anthony Wales	14 car, 105 yds, 2 TD
WKU	Receiving	Nicholas Norris	5 rec, 120 yds, 2 TD
USF	Passing	Quinton Flowers	14/32, 273 yds, 1 TD
USF	Rushing	Quinton Flowers	16 car, 108 yds, 2 TD
USF	Receiving	Rodney Adams	6 rec, 130 yds, 1 TD
