= 2007 Western Kentucky Hilltoppers football team =

American college football season

2007 Western Kentucky Hilltoppers football
- Conference: Independent
- Record: 7–5
- Head coach: David Elson (5th season)
- Offensive coordinator: Kevin Wright (1st season)
- Offensive scheme: Spread
- Defensive coordinator: Dennis Springer (1st season)
- Base defense: 3–4
- Home stadium: Houchens Industries–L. T. Smith Stadium

2007 NCAA Division I FCS independents football standings
| | Conf. | | | Overall |
| Team | W | | L | W | | L |
|---|---|---|---|---|---|---|
| Western Kentucky | | – | | 7 | – | 5 |
| Stony Brook | | – | | 6 | – | 5 |
| Presbyterian | | – | | 6 | – | 5 |
| Savannah State | | – | | 1 | – | 9 |

The 2007 Western Kentucky Hilltoppers football team represented Western Kentucky University (WKU) during the 2007 NCAA Division I FCS football season. The team's head coach was David Elson. It was the team's first and only season as an NCAA Division I FCS independent team as they made the transition from the Gateway Conference of Division I-AA (now FCS) to the Sun Belt Conference of the FBS. The Hilltoppers played their home games at Houchens Industries–L. T. Smith Stadium in Bowling Green, Kentucky.

== Schedule ==
| Date | Opponent | Site | Result | Attendance | Source |
|---|---|---|---|---|---|
| September 1 | at No. 6 Florida | Ben Hill Griffin Stadium; Gainesville, FL | L 3–49 | 90,086 | |
| September 8 | West Virginia Tech | Houchens Industries–L. T. Smith Stadium; Bowling Green, KY | W 87–0 | 16,165 | |
| September 15 | Eastern Kentucky | Houchens Industries–L. T. Smith Stadium; Bowling Green, KY (Battle of the Bluegrass) | W 26–6 | 18,898 | |
| September 20 | at Middle Tennessee State | Johnny "Red" Floyd Stadium; Murfreesboro, TN (100 Miles of Hate) | W 20–17 | 22,086 | |
| September 29 | at Bowling Green | Doyt Perry Stadium; Bowling Green, OH | L 21–42 | 20,622 | |
| October 13 | at Ball State | Scheumann Stadium; Muncie, IN | L 12–35 | 15,824 | |
| October 20 | at Indiana State | Memorial Stadium; Terre Haute, IN | W 56–7 | 5,027 | |
| October 27 | North Carolina Central | Houchens Industries–L. T. Smith Stadium; Bowling Green, KY | W 50–14 | 15,122 | |
| November 3 | at Chattanooga | Finley Stadium; Chattanooga, TN | W 28–21 | 5,668 | |
| November 10 | Troy^{†} | Houchens Industries–L. T. Smith Stadium; Bowling Green, KY | L 17–21 | 16,972 | |
| November 17 | Morehead State | Houchens Industries–L. T. Smith Stadium; Bowling Green, KY | W 52–12 | 15,282 | |
| November 24 | at North Texas | Fouts Field; Denton, TX | L 26–27 | 5,027 | |
^{†}Homecoming; Rankings from AP Poll released prior to the game

== Game summaries ==
=== At Florida ===
| | 1 | 2 | 3 | 4 | Total |
|---|---|---|---|---|---|
| Hilltoppers | 0 | 3 | 0 | 0 | 3 |
| No. 6 Florida | 14 | 14 | 7 | 14 | 49 |

=== West Virginia Tech ===
| | 1 | 2 | 3 | 4 | Total |
|---|---|---|---|---|---|
| Golden Bears | 0 | 0 | 0 | 0 | 0 |
| Hilltoppers | 49 | 3 | 28 | 7 | 87 |

=== Eastern Kentucky ===
| | 1 | 2 | 3 | 4 | Total |
|---|---|---|---|---|---|
| Colonels | 3 | 0 | 3 | 0 | 6 |
| Hilltoppers | 0 | 12 | 7 | 7 | 26 |

=== At Middle Tennessee State ===
| | 1 | 2 | 3 | 4 | Total |
|---|---|---|---|---|---|
| Hilltoppers | 0 | 10 | 3 | 7 | 20 |
| Blue Raiders | 3 | 7 | 7 | 0 | 17 |

=== At Bowling Green ===
| | 1 | 2 | 3 | 4 | Total |
|---|---|---|---|---|---|
| Hilltoppers | 0 | 0 | 7 | 14 | 21 |
| Falcons | 7 | 10 | 14 | 10 | 41 |

=== At Ball State ===
| | 1 | 2 | 3 | 4 | Total |
|---|---|---|---|---|---|
| Hilltoppers | 0 | 12 | 0 | 0 | 12 |
| Cardinals | 14 | 0 | 14 | 7 | 35 |

=== At Indiana State ===
| | 1 | 2 | 3 | 4 | Total |
|---|---|---|---|---|---|
| Hilltoppers | 21 | 21 | 14 | 0 | 56 |
| Sycamores | 0 | 0 | 0 | 7 | 7 |

=== North Carolina Central ===
| | 1 | 2 | 3 | 4 | Total |
|---|---|---|---|---|---|
| Eagles | 7 | 7 | 0 | 0 | 14 |
| Hilltoppers | 13 | 13 | 14 | 0 | 40 |

=== At Chattanooga ===
| | 1 | 2 | 3 | 4 | Total |
|---|---|---|---|---|---|
| Hilltoppers | 7 | 7 | 0 | 14 | 28 |
| Mocs | 0 | 14 | 7 | 0 | 21 |

=== Troy ===
| | 1 | 2 | 3 | 4 | Total |
|---|---|---|---|---|---|
| Trojans | 14 | 0 | 7 | 0 | 21 |
| Hilltoppers | 0 | 7 | 7 | 3 | 17 |

=== Morehead State ===
| | 1 | 2 | 3 | 4 | Total |
|---|---|---|---|---|---|
| Eagles | 6 | 0 | 0 | 6 | 12 |
| Hilltoppers | 14 | 24 | 14 | 0 | 52 |

=== At North Texas ===
| | 1 | 2 | 3 | 4 | Total |
|---|---|---|---|---|---|
| Hilltoppers | 7 | 13 | 3 | 3 | 26 |
| Mean Green | 0 | 7 | 14 | 6 | 27 |

== Coaching staff ==
| Name | Position | Alma mater |
| David Elson | Head coach | Butler 1994 |
| Mike Chism | Recruiting Coordinator/tight ends | Kentucky 1990 |
| Mike Dietzel | Special teams Coordinator/Outside Linebackers | Otterbein 1985 |
| Stuart Holt | Running backs | North Carolina 1995 |
| Cary Marquell | Inside Linebackers | Ball State 1996 |
| Eric Mathies | Defensive line | Murray State 1998 |
| T.J. Weist | Assistant head coach/Wide Receivers/passing game Coordinator | Alabama 1988 |
| Kevin Wright | Offensive coordinator/quarterbacks | WKU 1987 |
| Walter Wells | Running Game Coordinator/offensive line | Belmont 1993 |
| Andrew Koon | Graduate assistant | WKU 2006 |
| Erik Losey | Graduate assistant | WKU 2006 |
| Jamison Link | Student assistant | |
| Nick Uhlenhopp | Director of operations | Graceland 2002 |
| Mark Harris | Dir. of equipment and facility operations | |
| Bill Edwards | Head athletic trainer | WKU 1974 |
| Chris Zuccaro | Video coordinator | Ole Miss 2004 |
