= David Elson =

American football player and coach (born 1971)

Current position
- Title: Defensive Assistant
- Team: Louisville
- Conference: ACC

Biographical details
- Born: August 26, 1971 (age 55); Indianapolis, Indiana, U.S.

Playing career
- 1990–1993: Butler
- Position: Safety

Coaching career (HC unless noted)
- 1994–1995: Southern Illinois (GA)
- 1996–2000: Western Kentucky (DB)
- 2001–2002: Western Kentucky (DC)
- 2003–2009: Western Kentucky
- 2010: Indiana (assistant)
- 2011: Franklin-Simpson HS (KY) (DC)
- 2012–2013: New Mexico State (DC)
- 2014: Southern Illinois (DB)
- 2015: Southern Illinois (DC)
- 2016: Western Illinois (DC)
- 2017–2019: Ball State (DC)
- 2020: Marian (IN) (DC)
- 2021: Purdue (QC)
- 2022: Purdue (LB)
- 2023–2024: Wake Forest (analyst)
- 2025: Indiana State (DC/LB)
- 2026–: Louisville (assistant)

Head coaching record
- Overall: 39–44

David Elson (born August 26, 1971) is an American college football coach. He is a defensive assistant at the University of Louisville, a position he has held since 2026. Elson served as head football coach at Western Kentucky University (WKU) from 2003 to 2009. He oversaw the transition of Western Kentucky from a Football Championship Subdivision (formerly known as Division I-AA) to a Football Bowl Subdivision (formerly known as Division I-A) program, the highest division in college football; in his final season, the Hilltoppers joined the Sun Belt Conference.

== Coaching career ==
Elson joined the Hilltoppers staff as a defensive backs coach in 1996. He served as defensive coordinator for the 2001 and 2002 season before he was promoted to head coach. The rise to college football's highest level was difficult for the program, and Hilltoppers went 2–20 in Elson's final two seasons.

On November 9, 2009, Elson was fired by the university, finishing out the 2009 season. WKU alumnus and Stanford running backs coach Willie Taggart replaced him.

In March 2010, Indiana University head football coach Bill Lynch announced that Elson will be a defensive quality control coach. Coach Lynch noted this would mainly be an administrative role, but that he would be involved in coaching decisions. The Hoosiers made their first road trip of the year to play Elson's former team, the WKU Hilltoppers in Bowling Green, Kentucky.

Elson spent the 2011 football season as defensive coordinator for KHSAA state finalist Franklin-Simpson High School in Franklin, Kentucky.

On January 4, 2012, Elson was announced as the defensive coordinator at New Mexico State University.

On January 13, 2013, Elson was announced as the new secondary coach for the Southern Illinois University Carbondale, where he was a graduate assistant from 94 to 95. On January 20, 2016, after two years at Southern Illinois, Elson accepted the position as defensive coordinator at Western Illinois under new head coach Charlie Fisher.

In January 2023, Elson accepted a position as a defensive analyst at Wake Forest University.

== Personal life ==
Elson and his wife, Kathy, have three daughters.

== Head coaching record ==
Year	Team	Overall	Conference	Standing	Bowl/playoffs	TSN^{#}
Western Kentucky (Gateway Football Conference) (2003–2006)
2003	Western Kentucky	9–4	5–2	T–3rd	L NCAA Division I-AA Quarterfinal	7
2004	Western Kentucky	9–3	6–1	2nd	L NCAA Division I-AA First Round	11
2005	Western Kentucky	6–4	4–3	T–4th		
2006	Western Kentucky	6–5	4–3	T–4th		
Western Kentucky Hilltoppers (NCAA Division I FCS independent) (2007)
2007	Western Kentucky	7–5				
Western Kentucky Hilltoppers (NCAA Division I FBS independent) (2008)
2008	Western Kentucky	2–10				
Western Kentucky Hilltoppers (Sun Belt Conference) (2009)
2009	Western Kentucky	0–12	0–8	9th		
Western Kentucky:		39–43	19–17			
Total:		39–43				
