= 2009 Western Kentucky Hilltoppers football team =

American college football season

2009 Western Kentucky Hilltoppers football
- Conference: Sun Belt Conference
- Record: 0–12 (0–8 SBC)
- Head coach: David Elson (7th season)
- Offensive coordinator: Walter Wells (1st season)
- Offensive scheme: Spread
- Defensive coordinator: Mike Dietzel (3rd season)
- Base defense: 3–4
- Home stadium: Houchens Industries–L. T. Smith Stadium

2009 Sun Belt Conference football standings
	Conf.			Overall
Team	W		L	W		L
Troy $	8	–	0	9	–	4
Middle Tennessee	7	–	1	10	–	3
Louisiana–Monroe	5	–	3	6	–	6
Florida Atlantic	5	–	3	5	–	7
Louisiana–Lafayette	4	–	4	6	–	6
Arkansas State	3	–	5	4	–	8
FIU	3	–	5	3	–	9
North Texas	1	–	7	2	–	10
Western Kentucky	0	–	8	0	–	12
$ – Conference champion

The 2009 Western Kentucky Hilltoppers football team represented Western Kentucky University (WKU) during the 2009 NCAA Division I FBS football season. The team's head coach was David Elson. This year was their first year as a member of the Sun Belt Conference following one year as an FBS independent. The Hilltoppers played their home games at Houchens Industries–L. T. Smith Stadium in Bowling Green, Kentucky.

== Schedule ==
Date	Time	Opponent	Site	TV	Result	Attendance
September 5	11:21 am	at Tennessee*	Neyland Stadium; Knoxville, TN	SEC Network	L 7–63	98,761
September 12	6:30 pm	South Florida*	Houchens Industries–L. T. Smith Stadium; Bowling Green, KY	Big East Network	L 13–35	20,568
September 19	6:00 pm	No. 13 FCS Central Arkansas*	Houchens Industries–L. T. Smith Stadium; Bowling Green, KY		L 7–28	17,295
September 26	2:30 pm	at Navy*	Navy–Marine Corps Memorial Stadium; Annapolis, MD	CBSCS	L 22–38	29,009
October 10	6:00 pm	Florida International	Houchens Industries–L. T. Smith Stadium; Bowling Green, KY		L 20–37	13,574
October 17	6:00 pm	Louisiana-Lafayette	Houchens Industries–L. T. Smith Stadium; Bowling Green, KY		L 22–30	11,919
October 24	2:30 pm	at Middle Tennessee	Johnny "Red" Floyd Stadium; Murfreesboro, TN (100 Miles of Hate)	Sun Belt Network	L 24–62	17,787
October 31	3:30 pm	at North Texas	Fouts Field; Denton, TX	Sun Belt Network	L 49–68	11,214
November 7	4:00 pm	Troy^{†}	Houchens Industries–L. T. Smith Stadium; Bowling Green, KY		L 20–40	16,747
November 14	3:00 pm	at Louisiana-Monroe	Malone Stadium; Monroe, LA		L 18–21	16,229
November 28	3:00 pm	at Florida Atlantic	Lockhart Stadium; Fort Lauderdale, FL		L 23–29	14,671
December 3	6:00 pm	Arkansas State	Houchens Industries–L. T. Smith Stadium; Bowling Green, KY	Sun Belt Network	L 20–24	4,513
*Non-conference game; ^{†}Homecoming; Rankings from Coaches' Poll released prior to the game; All times are in Central time

== Coaching change ==
On November 9, 2009, David Elson was officially released as Western Kentucky's head coach. He remained as head coach until the end of the 2009 season. He was replaced by Stanford's running backs coach Willie Taggart, a Western Kentucky University alumnus.
