= 2015 South Florida Bulls football team =

American college football season

2015 South Florida Bulls football

Miami Beach Bowl, L 35–45 vs. Western Kentucky
- Conference: American Athletic Conference
- East Division
- Record: 8–5 (6–2 AAC)
- Head coach: Willie Taggart (3rd season)
- Co-offensive coordinators: Danny Hope (1st season); David Reaves (1st season)
- Offensive scheme: Gulf Coast
- Defensive coordinator: Tom Allen (1st season)
- Base defense: 4–2–5
- Home stadium: Raymond James Stadium

2015 American Athletic Conference football standings
| | Conf. | | | Overall |
| Team | W | | L | W | | L |
|---|---|---|---|---|---|---|
East Division
| Temple x | 7 | – | 1 | 10 | – | 4 |
| South Florida | 6 | – | 2 | 8 | – | 5 |
| Cincinnati | 4 | – | 4 | 7 | – | 6 |
| UConn | 4 | – | 4 | 6 | – | 7 |
| East Carolina | 3 | – | 5 | 5 | – | 7 |
| UCF | 0 | – | 8 | 0 | – | 12 |
West Division
| No. 8 Houston xy$ | 7 | – | 1 | 13 | – | 1 |
| No. 18 Navy x | 7 | – | 1 | 11 | – | 2 |
| Memphis | 5 | – | 3 | 9 | – | 4 |
| Tulsa | 3 | – | 5 | 6 | – | 7 |
| Tulane | 1 | – | 7 | 3 | – | 9 |
| SMU | 1 | – | 7 | 2 | – | 10 |
Championship: Houston 24, Temple 13
$ – Conference champion; x – Division champion/co-champions; y – Championship game participant; As of December 31, 2015; Rankings from AP Poll

The 2015 South Florida Bulls football team represented the University of South Florida (USF) in the 2015 NCAA Division I FBS football season. The 2015 college football season was the 19th season for the Bulls, and their third as a member of the American Athletic Conference (The American), this season joining the newly formed East Division. They played their home games at Raymond James Stadium in Tampa, FL. They were led by Head Coach Willie Taggart, who was in his third year. They finished the season 8–5, 6–2 in American Athletic play to finish in second place in the East Division. They were invited to the Miami Beach Bowl where they lost to Western Kentucky.

== Schedule ==
| Date | Time | Opponent | Site | TV | Result | Attendance |
|---|---|---|---|---|---|---|
| September 5 | 7:00 p.m. | Florida A&M* | Raymond James Stadium; Tampa, FL | ESPN3 | W 51–3 | 30,434 |
| September 12 | 11:30 a.m. | at No. 11 Florida State* | Doak Campbell Stadium; Tallahassee, FL | ESPN | L 14–34 | 72,811 |
| September 19 | 12:00 p.m. | at Maryland* | Byrd Stadium; College Park, MD | ESPNU | L 17–35 | 36,827 |
| October 2 | 7:00 p.m. | Memphis | Raymond James Stadium; Tampa, FL | ESPN2 | L 17–24 | 22,546 |
| October 10 | 3:30 p.m. | Syracuse*^{†} | Raymond James Stadium; Tampa, FL | CBSSN | W 45–24 | 27,235 |
| October 17 | 12:00 p.m. | at UConn | Rentschler Field; East Hartford, CT | ESPNU | W 28–20 | 31,719 |
| October 24 | 4:00 p.m. | SMU | Raymond James Stadium; Tampa, FL | ESPNews | W 38–14 | 24,338 |
| October 31 | 12:00 p.m. | at Navy | Navy–Marine Corps Memorial Stadium; Annapolis, MD | CBSSN | L 17–29 | 26,766 |
| November 7 | 7:30 p.m. | at East Carolina | Dowdy–Ficklen Stadium; Greenville, NC | CBSSN | W 22–17 | 45,194 |
| November 14 | 7:00 p.m. | No. 21 Temple | Raymond James Stadium; Tampa, FL | CBSSN | W 44–23 | 28,393 |
| November 20 | 8:00 p.m. | Cincinnati | Raymond James Stadium; Tampa, FL | CBSSN | W 65–27 | 26,522 |
| November 26 | 7:30 p.m. | at UCF | Bright House Networks Stadium; Orlando, FL (rivalry) | ESPN | W 44–3 | 25,967 |
| December 21 | 2:30 p.m. | vs. No. 25 Western Kentucky* | Marlins Park; Miami, FL (Miami Beach Bowl) | ESPN | L 35–45 | 21,712 |
*Non-conference game; ^{†}Homecoming; Rankings from AP Poll released prior to the game; All times are in Eastern time

== Game summaries ==
=== Florida A&M ===
| | 1 | 2 | 3 | 4 | Total |
|---|---|---|---|---|---|
| Rattlers | 0 | 0 | 3 | 0 | 3 |
| Bulls | 3 | 13 | 14 | 21 | 51 |

=== At Florida State ===
| | 1 | 2 | 3 | 4 | Total |
|---|---|---|---|---|---|
| Bulls | 0 | 7 | 0 | 7 | 14 |
| #11 Seminoles | 7 | 0 | 17 | 10 | 34 |

=== At Maryland ===
| | 1 | 2 | 3 | 4 | Total |
|---|---|---|---|---|---|
| Bulls | 7 | 3 | 7 | 0 | 17 |
| Terrapins | 14 | 7 | 7 | 7 | 35 |

=== Memphis ===
| | 1 | 2 | 3 | 4 | Total |
|---|---|---|---|---|---|
| Tigers | 0 | 7 | 10 | 7 | 24 |
| Bulls | 7 | 3 | 0 | 7 | 17 |

=== Syracuse ===
| | 1 | 2 | 3 | 4 | Total |
|---|---|---|---|---|---|
| Orange | 0 | 3 | 14 | 7 | 24 |
| Bulls | 0 | 10 | 21 | 14 | 45 |

=== At UConn ===
| | 1 | 2 | 3 | 4 | Total |
|---|---|---|---|---|---|
| Bulls | 0 | 7 | 14 | 7 | 28 |
| Huskies | 0 | 3 | 10 | 7 | 20 |

=== SMU ===
| | 1 | 2 | 3 | 4 | Total |
|---|---|---|---|---|---|
| Mustangs | 7 | 0 | 0 | 7 | 14 |
| Bulls | 3 | 14 | 7 | 14 | 38 |

=== At Navy ===
| | 1 | 2 | 3 | 4 | Total |
|---|---|---|---|---|---|
| Bulls | 10 | 0 | 7 | 0 | 17 |
| Midshipmen | 3 | 10 | 3 | 13 | 29 |

=== At East Carolina ===
| | 1 | 2 | 3 | 4 | Total |
|---|---|---|---|---|---|
| Bulls | 2 | 10 | 0 | 10 | 22 |
| Pirates | 0 | 7 | 7 | 3 | 17 |

=== Temple ===
| | 1 | 2 | 3 | 4 | Total |
|---|---|---|---|---|---|
| #21 Owls | 7 | 3 | 10 | 3 | 23 |
| Bulls | 7 | 24 | 3 | 10 | 44 |

=== Cincinnati ===
| | 1 | 2 | 3 | 4 | Total |
|---|---|---|---|---|---|
| Bearcats | 0 | 3 | 17 | 7 | 27 |
| Bulls | 27 | 24 | 7 | 7 | 65 |

=== At UCF ===
| | 1 | 2 | 3 | 4 | Total |
|---|---|---|---|---|---|
| Bulls | 7 | 17 | 14 | 6 | 44 |
| Knights | 3 | 0 | 0 | 0 | 3 |

=== WKU (Miami Beach Bowl) ===
| | 1 | 2 | 3 | 4 | Total |
|---|---|---|---|---|---|
| #25 Hilltoppers | 0 | 10 | 28 | 7 | 45 |
| Bulls | 7 | 7 | 7 | 14 | 35 |
