= Cam Thomas (cornerback) =

American football player (born 1991)

No. 41
- Position: Cornerback

Personal information
- Born: May 5, 1991 (age 35); Paterson, New Jersey, U.S.
- Listed height: 6 ft 1 in (1.85 m)
- Listed weight: 200 lb (91 kg)

Career information
- High school: Milford Academy
- College: Western Kentucky
- NFL draft: 2015: undrafted

Career history
- Buffalo Bills (2015)
- Stats at Pro Football Reference

Cam Thomas (born May 5, 1991) is an American former professional football cornerback. He was signed by the Buffalo Bills as an undrafted free agent in 2015. He played college football at Western Kentucky. He spent the 2015 season with the Bills.

== College career ==
Thomas was with Western Kentucky from 2010 to 2014.

== Professional career ==
Pre-draft measurables
Height	Weight	Arm length	Hand span	40-yard dash	10-yard split	20-yard split	20-yard shuttle	Three-cone drill	Vertical jump	Broad jump	Bench press
6 ft 0 1/4 in (1.84 m)	200 lb (91 kg)	33 1/8 in (0.84 m)	8 3/4 in (0.22 m)	4.67 s	1.71 s	2.71 s	4.38 s	7.00 s	36.0 in (0.91 m)	10 ft 2 in (3.10 m)	16 reps
All values from Pro Day

Thomas was signed by the Buffalo Bills as an undrafted free agent following the 2015 NFL draft.

Thomas was cut by the Bills on April 18, 2016, after being on the PUP List all of the 2015 season.
