= Curtis Hamilton (American football) =

Actor

- Born: Curtis Hamilton; Pordenone, Italy or West Paducah, Kentucky, U.S.
- Education: Western Kentucky University
- Occupations: Footballer, actor
- Years active: 2008-09, 2011–present
- Known for: Role of Dr. Dre in Surviving Compton: Dre, Suge, and Michel'le

Curtis Hamilton (born November 15, 1985) is an American actor and former professional football player who was a wide receiver in the National Football League (NFL). He played college football for Western Kentucky from 2004 through 2007 before playing professionally for the New Orleans Saints and Chicago Bears.

== Early life ==
Hamilton was born to parents Curtis, an entrepreneur, and Linette, a teacher. He went to Paducah Tilghman High School. He graduated from Western Kentucky University.

== Career ==
=== Football career ===
Hamilton was a wide receiver for the New Orleans Saints of the National Football League. On 27 April 2008, he was signed as a free agent by the Chicago Bears. Previously, he played for Western Kentucky from 2004 through 2007.

=== Acting career ===
In 2012, he moved to Hollywood and appeared in 30 national TV commercials and print campaigns. In 2016, he played the lead role of American rapper Dr. Dre in the original film, Surviving Compton: Dre, Suge, and Michel'le. The film was released in on 15 October 2016. The movie is considered a response from Michel'le's side of her relationship that was not included in the movie released in 2015, Straight Outta Compton. Dr. Dre had an abusive relationship with Michel'le, that the original movie does not depict. Before appearing in this film, Hamilton had minor parts in shows Rizzoli & Isles. In 2015, he wrote, directed and produced the short film The Missed Call.
