= 2010–2013 Conference USA realignment =

Conference USA's logo prior to 2012.

Conference USA's current logo, used since 2012.

The 2010–13 Conference USA realignment refers to Conference USA (C-USA) dealing with several proposed and actual conference expansion and reduction plans among various NCAA conferences and institutions from 2010 to 2013.

== Background ==
On October 14, 2011 Conference USA and the Mountain West Conference announced they would enter into a football-only alliance, forming a 22-team league. The league would span 15 states and 5 time zones.

However, following further defections from both conferences, the two leagues decided to enter into talks on a full merger. In early February 2012, ESPN.com reported that the C-USA board of directors was to meet to discuss the merger. This topic had been on the agenda even before the recent announcement that C-USA charter member Memphis had accepted an invitation from the Big East. The two conferences then met on February 12, with media reporting the following day that an official announcement of a full merger was imminent. It was reported at the time that the new conference could begin as early as 2013–14.

C-USA and the MW initially wished to dissolve and form a new association in order to negotiate new television deals. However, the NCAA told the conferences that if they merged, the new league would receive only one automatic bid to NCAA championships; at least one of the merging conferences would not receive its share of so-called "tournament units" (explained below); and at least one of the merging conferences would forfeit its conference exit fees to the departing schools. Conferences receive roughly $250,000 for each round that a member advances in the NCAA men's basketball tournament; the money is paid out after a rolling six-year period. In the event of a dissolution or merger, tournament units revert to the schools that earned them. The revenue loss to the two conferences potentially outweighed any possible gains from a new broadcast deal.

With the option of a complete merger now likely off the table, the commissioners of both C-USA and the MW indicated that all 16 schools that had been committed to those conferences beyond 2013 (15 for all sports, and Hawaiʻi for football only) had entered into binding agreements to form a new alliance. In addition, five subgroups of school presidents had been working on various aspects of the alliance since mid-February. Finally, both commissioners stated that they expected the future membership of their conferences to be set by early June 2012.

On March 12, CBSSports.com reported, citing "college football industry sources", that the MW and C-USA had been in contact with as many as 11 schools regarding the new alliance, including all seven schools that would be football members of the WAC in 2012. Other schools reportedly interested in the alliance included Sun Belt Conference members Florida Atlantic, FIU and North Texas, plus C-USA charter member Charlotte, then a non-football school in the Atlantic 10 but with plans to add a football program in 2013. The following month, CBSSports.com reported that Utah State and San Jose State were the likeliest candidates for MW membership, with the possibility of UTEP switching from C-USA to the MW. It also indicated that FIU, North Texas, and Louisiana Tech—the last of which was also being courted by the Sun Belt—were the top candidates for C-USA.

Due to defections from the MW earlier in the realignment cycle, it had to expand to maintain its FBS status. The NCAA requires that FBS conferences sponsor at least six men's sports and eight women's sports, with at least six schools in each sport. As of April 2012, the MW did not have enough schools committed to the conference beyond 2013 to sponsor championships in baseball and men's cross country. C-USA also needed to expand if it wished to continue sponsoring women's swimming and diving.

On May 4, no fewer than seven schools announced moves to one of the two conferences. Charlotte, FIU, Louisiana Tech, North Texas, and UTSA will join C-USA, with Utah State and San Jose State joining the MW. All moves will take effect in 2013. In addition, Old Dominion, an all-sports member of the CAA, including football, was reportedly considering an invitation from C-USA, which would also require an FBS upgrade. A later report indicated that Old Dominion would announce its decision no later than June 30. The Mountain West reportedly chose not to expand beyond 10 schools because it wanted to keep places open for Boise State and San Diego State to return if their football moves to the Big East did not work out.

Old Dominion announced its move to C-USA on May 17. The Monarchs will not start their FBS transition until the 2013 season, matching the plans of fellow C-USA newcomer Charlotte. Both will become C-USA football members in 2015, when their FBS transitions are complete. At the time, this gave the conference 14 members in 2013 for all sports except football; as a result, C-USA was expected to split into divisions for all sports (it already uses divisions in football). The dividing line will reportedly be the Mississippi River, with Tulane, located on the east bank of the river in New Orleans, joining the West Division. Since C-USA will continue to have at least 12 football members, its football championship game will continue for the foreseeable future. As for the CAA, reports indicated that it may pursue Davidson and Charleston from the Southern Conference. The conference ultimately invited both schools in October 2012; it was turned down by Davidson (who eventually agreed to join the Atlantic 10 Conference), but Charleston was expected to accept, and went on to officially join the CAA.

In the wake of the Big East losing Rutgers and another school (Louisville a few days later), the Big East raided Conference USA and invited Tulane and East Carolina (football only) to join the conference and they accepted. Later in 2013 after the Big East non-football members decided to split and form a new conference East Carolina was invited as a full member to start with the 2014 season. Later on in November 28, 2012, rumors popped up that Middle Tennessee and Florida Atlantic of the Sun Belt would be invited to replace those schools. These rumors proved to be accurate; the following day, C-USA announced that both schools would join the conference no later than 2014. On January 18, 2013, CBS Sports reported that C-USA had reached an agreement for Middle Tennessee and Florida Atlantic to join in July 2013, a year earlier than originally planned. C-USA officially announced the change in plans on January 22.

Less than a week after ECU accepted the full-membership invite to the renamed conference (which would eventually choose the name American Athletic Conference), C-USA added Western Kentucky to start membership in 2014, bringing the conference into that state for the first time since Louisville left in 2005. C-USA was preparing to lose Tulsa to The American, which was confirmed the next day.

== Membership changes ==
School	Sport(s)	Former conference	New conference	Date move was announced	Expected year move takes effect
UCF Knights	Full membership	C-USA	The American	December 7, 2011	2013
Houston Cougars	Full membership	C-USA	The American	December 7, 2011	2013
SMU Mustangs	Full membership	C-USA	The American	December 7, 2011	2013
Memphis Tigers	Full membership	C-USA	The American	February 8, 2012	2013
Charlotte 49ers	Full membership	Atlantic 10	C-USA	May 4, 2012	2013
FIU Panthers	Full membership	Sun Belt	C-USA	May 4, 2012	2013
Louisiana Tech Bulldogs and Lady Techsters	Full membership	WAC	C-USA	May 4, 2012	2013
North Texas Mean Green	Full membership	Sun Belt	C-USA	May 4, 2012	2013
UTSA Roadrunners	Full membership	WAC	C-USA	May 4, 2012	2013
Old Dominion Monarchs	Full membership	CAA	C-USA	May 17, 2012	2013
New Mexico Lobos	Men's soccer	MPSF	C-USA	September 4, 2012	2013
Old Dominion Monarchs and Lady Monarchs	Men's and women's golf, men's and women's tennis, women's rowing	CAA	C-USA	September 4, 2012	2012
East Carolina Pirates	Football	C-USA	The American	November 27, 2012	2014
Tulane Green Wave	Full membership	C-USA	The American	November 27, 2012	2014
Florida Atlantic Owls	Full membership	Sun Belt	C-USA	November 29, 2012	2013
Middle Tennessee Blue Raiders	Full membership	Sun Belt	C-USA	November 29, 2012	2013
Sacramento State Hornets	Women's rowing	WIRA	C-USA	March 6, 2013	2013
San Diego State Aztecs	Women's rowing	WIRA	C-USA	March 6, 2013	2013
East Carolina Pirates	Full membership	C-USA	The American	March 27, 2013	2014
Western Kentucky Hilltoppers and Lady Toppers	Full membership	Sun Belt	C-USA	April 1, 2013	2014
Tulsa Golden Hurricane	Full membership	C-USA	The American	April 2, 2013	2014

== See also ==
- NCAA conference realignment
- 2010–13 NCAA conference realignment
- 2005 NCAA conference realignment
- 1996 NCAA conference realignment
