= 2012 Western Kentucky Hilltoppers football team =

American college football season

2012 Western Kentucky Hilltoppers football

Little Caesars Pizza Bowl vs. Central Michigan, L 21–24
- Conference: Sun Belt Conference
- Record: 7–6 (4–4 Sun Belt)
- Head coach: Willie Taggart (3rd season; regular season); Lance Guidry (interim; bowl game)
- Offensive scheme: West Coast
- Defensive coordinator: Lance Guidry (2nd season)
- Base defense: 4–3
- Home stadium: Houchens Industries–L. T. Smith Stadium

2012 Sun Belt Conference football standings
	Conf.			Overall
Team	W		L	W		L
Arkansas State $	7	–	1	10	–	3
Louisiana–Monroe	6	–	2	8	–	5
Middle Tennessee	6	–	2	8	–	4
Louisiana–Lafayette *	4	–	2	5	–	4
Western Kentucky	4	–	4	7	–	6
Troy	3	–	5	5	–	7
North Texas	3	–	5	4	–	8
Florida Atlantic	2	–	6	3	–	9
FIU	2	–	6	3	–	9
South Alabama **	1	–	7	2	–	11
$ – Conference champion; * – Louisiana–Lafayette vacated 4 wins due to NCAA violations. ** – South Alabama was ineligible for the conference title or a bowl game as part of their transition to the FBS.

The 2012 Western Kentucky Hilltoppers football team represented Western Kentucky University in the 2012 NCAA Division I FBS football season. They were led by third-year head coach Willie Taggart and played their home games at Houchens Industries–L. T. Smith Stadium. They were a member of the Sun Belt Conference. They finished the season 7–6, 4–4 in Sun Belt play to finish in fifth place. They were invited to the Little Caesars Pizza Bowl, their first bowl appearance since joining FBS in 2007, where they were defeated by Central Michigan.

After a three-year record of 16–20, head coach Willie Taggart resigned in December to become the head coach at South Florida. Defensive coordinator Lance Guidry coached the Hilltoppers in Little Caesars Pizza Bowl. Bobby Petrino was hired as the school's new head coach on December 10, 2012.

== Schedule ==
Date	Time	Opponent	Site	TV	Result	Attendance
September 1	6:00 p.m.	Austin Peay*	Houchens Industries–L. T. Smith Stadium; Bowling Green, Kentucky	ESPN3	W 49–10	16,327
September 8	3:30 p.m.	at No. 1 Alabama*	Bryant–Denny Stadium; Tuscaloosa, Alabama	SECN	L 0–35	101,821
September 15	6:00 p.m.	at Kentucky*	Commonwealth Stadium; Lexington, Kentucky	ESPNU	W 32–31 ^{OT}	53,980
September 22	6:00 p.m.	Southern Miss*	Houchens Industries–L. T. Smith Stadium; Bowling Green, Kentucky	ESPN3	W 42–17	23,252
September 29	6:00 p.m.	at Arkansas State	Liberty Bank Stadium; Jonesboro, Arkansas	ESPN3	W 26–13	25,160
October 11	6:30 p.m.	at Troy	Veterans Memorial Stadium; Troy, Alabama	ESPNU	W 31–26	16,426
October 20	3:00 p.m.	Louisiana–Monroe†	Houchens Industries–L. T. Smith Stadium; Bowling Green, Kentucky	ESPN3	L 42–43 ^{OT}	22,323
October 27	6:00 p.m.	at FIU	FIU Stadium; Miami	ESPN3	W 14–6	12,842
November 1	8:15 p.m.	Middle Tennessee	Houchens Industries–L. T. Smith Stadium; Bowling Green, Kentucky (100 Miles of Hate)	ESPNU	L 29–34	17,327
November 10	12:00 p.m.	Florida Atlantic	Houchens Industries–L. T. Smith Stadium; Bowling Green, Kentucky	SBN/CSS	L 28–37	14,185
November 17	6:00 p.m.	at Louisiana–Lafayette	Cajun Field; Lafayette, Louisiana	ESPN3	L 27–31	20,314
November 24	12:00 p.m.	North Texas	Houchens Industries–L. T. Smith Stadium; Bowling Green, Kentucky	SBN/CSS	W 25–24	11,074
December 26	6:30 p.m.	vs. Central Michigan*	Ford Field; Detroit (Little Caesars Pizza Bowl)	ESPN	L 21–24	23,310
*Non-conference game; Rankings from Coaches' Poll released prior to the game; All times are in Central time

== Game summaries ==
=== Austin Peay ===
	1	2	3	4	Total
Governors	9	9	7	3	28
Hilltoppers	14	21	7	7	49

=== @ Alabama ===
	1	2	3	4	Total
Hilltoppers	0	0	0	0	0
#1 Crimson Tide	14	7	7	7	35

=== @ Kentucky ===
	1	2	3	4	OT	Total
Hilltoppers	3	14	7	0	8	32
Wildcats	0	10	7	7	7	31

The win over the Wildcats of the SEC marks the Hilltoppers first ever win over a team from a Bowl Championship Series conference..

=== Southern Miss ===
	1	2	3	4	Total
Golden Eagles	0	3	7	7	17
Hilltoppers	14	7	21	0	42

=== @ Arkansas State ===
	1	2	3	4	Total
Hilltoppers	0	0	14	12	26
Red Wolves	3	10	0	0	13

=== @ Troy ===
	1	2	3	4	Total
Hilltoppers	7	7	14	3	31
Trojans	10	7	9	0	26

=== Louisiana–Monroe ===
	1	2	3	4	OT	Total
Warhawks	0	21	0	14	8	43
Hilltoppers	7	21	0	7	7	42

=== @ FIU ===
	1	2	3	4	Total
Hilltoppers	7	0	0	7	14
Panthers	3	0	0	3	6

=== Middle Tennessee ===
	1	2	3	4	Total
Blue Raiders	10	7	7	10	34
Hilltoppers	7	10	7	5	29

=== Florida Atlantic ===
	1	2	3	4	Total
Owls	0	14	7	16	37
Hilltoppers	7	7	0	14	28

=== @ Louisiana–Lafayette ===
	1	2	3	4	Total
Hilltoppers	0	10	3	14	27
Ragin' Cajuns	0	10	7	14	31

=== North Texas ===
	1	2	3	4	Total
Mean Green	7	10	7	0	24
Hilltoppers	7	3	0	15	25

=== Central Michigan–Little Caesars Pizza Bowl ===
	1	2	3	4	Total
Hilltoppers	7	7	7	0	21
Chippewas	14	3	0	7	24

This will be the Hilltoppers first bowl game since becoming a member of the FBS in 2007.
