= Taywan Taylor =

American football player (born 1995)

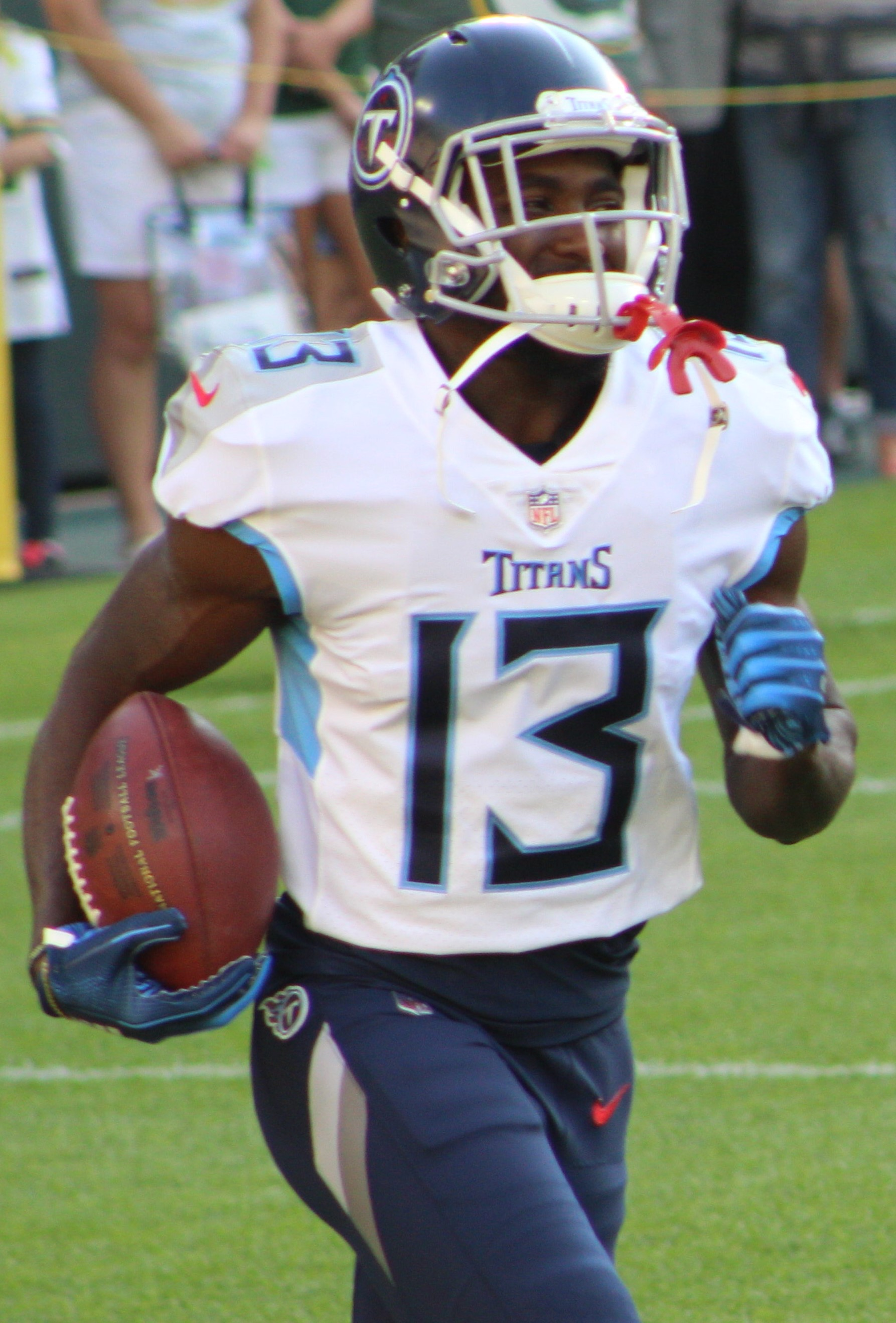
- Taylor with the Tennessee Titans in 2018

No. 13, 10
- Position: Wide receiver

Personal information
- Born: March 2, 1995 (age 31); Louisville, Kentucky, U.S.
- Listed height: 5 ft 11 in (1.80 m)
- Listed weight: 205 lb (93 kg)

Career information
- High school: Pleasure Ridge Park (Louisville)
- College: Western Kentucky (2013-2016)
- NFL draft: 2017: 3rd round, 72nd overall pick

Career history
- Tennessee Titans (2017–2018); Cleveland Browns (2019–2020); Houston Texans (2021)*; New Orleans Breakers (2022)
- * Offseason or practice squad member only

Awards and highlights
- 2× First-team All-C-USA (2015, 2016)

Career NFL statistics
- Receptions: 53
- Receiving yards: 697
- Receiving touchdowns: 2
- Stats at Pro Football Reference

Taywan Marshawn Taylor (born March 2, 1995) is an American former professional football player who was a wide receiver in the National Football League (NFL). He played college football for the Western Kentucky Hilltoppers and was selected by the Tennessee Titans in the third round of the 2017 NFL draft.

After two seasons with the Titans, he was then traded to the Cleveland Browns, with whom he received minimal playing time over the next two seasons. He then had an offseason stint with the Houston Texans in 2021. In 2022, he played for the New Orleans Breakers of the United States Football League (USFL).

== Early life ==
Taylor attended Pleasure Ridge Park High School in Louisville, Kentucky. As a senior, he had 52 receptions for 1,169 yards and 18 total touchdowns for the football team. He committed to Western Kentucky University to play college football. Taylor also played basketball in high school.

== College career ==
As a true freshman at Western Kentucky in 2013, Taylor played in 11 games with seven starts and had 24 receptions for 270 yards. As a sophomore in 2014, he played in all 13 games with seven starts and recorded 45 receptions for 767 yards and seven touchdowns. Taylor set numerous school records his junior year in 2015. He finished the year with 86 receptions for 1,467 yards and 17 touchdowns, all school records. He also broke school records for career receiving yards and receiving touchdowns during the season. As a senior in 2016, Taylor broke the previous year's records with 98 receptions for 1,730 yards and 17 touchdowns. He also broke the school career receptions record during the season. For his career, he had 253 receptions for 4,234 yards and 41 touchdowns.

He graduated from Western Kentucky in May 2017 with a degree in elementary education.

== Professional career ==
=== Pre-draft ===
On November 15, 2016, it was reported that Taylor and teammate Forrest Lamp had received and accepted offers to play in the 2017 Senior Bowl. Taylor was impressive during Senior Bowl practices and showed his ability to focus on contested catches and showed smooth route running. He reportedly drew interest from multiple teams throughout the week and had meetings with the Tampa Bay Buccaneers and Oakland Raiders. On January 28, 2017, Taylor caught one reception for 14-yards, helping Cleveland Browns' head coach Hue Jackson's South team defeat the North 16–15. Taylor was one of 58 wide receivers invited to perform at the NFL Scouting Combine in Indianapolis, Indiana. He completed all of the combine drills and finished first among his position group in the three-cone drill, tied for third in the short shuttle, and finished sixth in the broad jump. On March 27, 2017, Taylor attended Western Kentucky's pro day, along with Forrest Lamp, Max Halpin, and six other teammates. He opted to run positional drills and attempted to improve on his vertical jump and broad jump from the combine. Taylor increased his vertical to 38", but was unable to improve on his broad jump. At the conclusion of the pre-draft process, Taylor was projected by NFL draft experts and analysts to be a third- or fourth-round pick. He was ranked the 14th best wide receiver prospect by NFLDraftScout.com.

Pre-draft measurables
Height	Weight	Arm length	Hand span	40-yard dash	10-yard split	20-yard split	20-yard shuttle	Three-cone drill	Vertical jump	Broad jump	Bench press
5 ft 11 in (1.80 m)	203 lb (92 kg)	32 5/8 in (0.83 m)	9 1/4 in (0.23 m)	4.50 s	1.56 s	2.56 s	4.21 s	6.57 s	38 in (0.97 m)	11 ft 0 in (3.35 m)	13 reps
All values from NFL Combine/Pro Day

=== Tennessee Titans ===
==== 2017 season ====
The Tennessee Titans selected Taylor in the third round (72nd overall) of the 2017 NFL draft. He was the second wide receiver selected by the Titans in 2017, behind Western Michigan's Corey Davis, who was selected in the first round (5th overall). On June 5, 2017, the Titans signed Taylor to a four-year, $3.68 million contract that includes a signing bonus of $916,012.

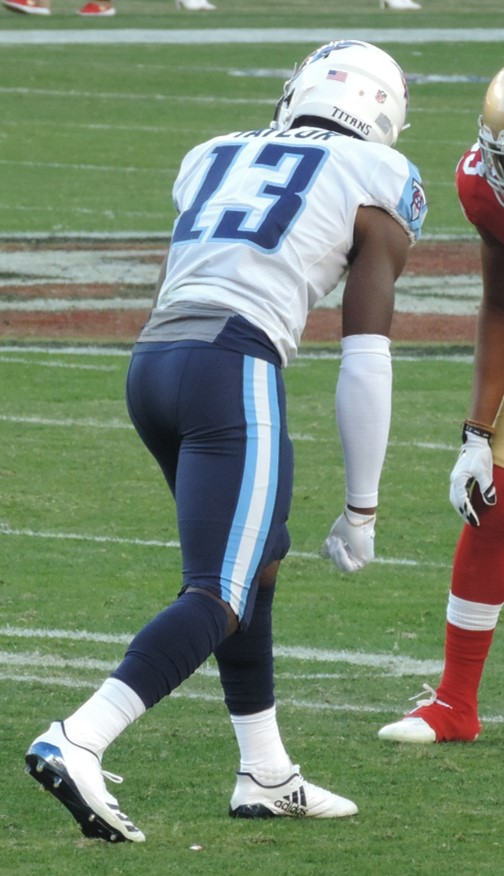
Taylor in 2017

Throughout training camp, he competed against Eric Decker for the vacant starting slot receiver job after the departure of longtime veteran Kendall Wright during free agency. Although he competed with Decker, he worked and learned under him extensively. Head coach Mike Mularkey named him the fourth wide receiver on the depth chart to start the regular season, behind Rishard Matthews, Eric Decker, and Corey Davis.

Taylor made his NFL debut in the Titans' season-opener against the Raiders and recorded two receptions for 14-yards during their 26–16 loss. His first career reception came in the second quarter on a four-yard pass from Marcus Mariota before being tackled by Raiders' cornerback Sean Smith. On October 8, 2017, Taylor earned his first career start after Corey Davis was inactive due to a hamstring injury. He had a 5-yard carry during a 16–10 loss to the Miami Dolphins. On October 16, 2017, he caught his first NFL touchdown, a 53-yard pass from Mariota in a 36–22 victory over the Indianapolis Colts on Monday Night Football. Taylor finished the game with two receptions for 61 receiving yards. The following game, Taylor had a season-high three receptions for 45-yards during a 12–9 overtime victory at the Browns.

Taylor finished his rookie season with 16 receptions, 231 receiving yards, 43 rushing yards, and 1 receiving touchdown. The Titans made the playoffs and faced off against the Kansas City Chiefs in the Wild Card Round. In the 22–21 victory, he had a four-yard reception. In the Divisional Round against the New England Patriots, he had a five-yard reception as the Titans lost 35–14.

==== 2018 season ====
On September 16, 2018, Taylor caught his first and only touchdown of the season on a screen pass from Blaine Gabbert as the Titans beat the Houston Texans by a score of 20–17. Two weeks later, Taylor had a career-high seven receptions for 77 yards during a 26–23 overtime victory over the Philadelphia Eagles. However, during a Week 9 victory against the Dallas Cowboys, Taylor injured his foot, causing him to miss the next 3 games. He returned in time for the Week 13 matchup against the New York Jets and had his first 100-yard game, catching 3 passes for 104 yards as the Titans won by a score of 26–22.

Taylor finished his second professional season with 37 receptions for 466 yards and a touchdown.

=== Cleveland Browns ===
On August 31, 2019, Taylor was traded to the Browns for an undisclosed 2020 NFL draft pick. Taylor only played in three games from Weeks 2–4, starting the Browns' Week two game against the Jets, and was only targeted once for a reception in the season, not making it. He did return three kicks for 53 yards. The Browns finished with a 6–10 record.

Taylor was waived by the Browns on September 5, 2020. The Browns re-signed Taylor to their practice squad the following day. Taylor was promoted to the Browns' active roster on October 7. The Browns placed Taylor on injured reserve with a neck injury on December 8.

=== Houston Texans ===
On May 20, 2021, Taylor signed a one-year deal with the Houston Texans. He was placed on injured reserve on August 25, and released on September 3.

=== New Orleans Breakers ===
Taylor was selected by the New Orleans Breakers of the United States Football League (USFL) in the 16th round of the 2022 USFL draft. He was transferred to the team's practice squad before the start of the regular season on April 16, and transferred back to the active roster on April 22.

== Career statistics ==
=== NFL ===
Regular season statistics
Season	Team	Games		Receiving					Rushing					Returning					Fumbles	
Season	Team	GP	GS	Rec	Yds	Avg	Lng	TD	Att	Yds	Avg	Lng	TD	Ret	Yds	Avg	Lng	TD	FUM	Lost
2017	TEN	16	4	16	231	14.4	53T	1	8	43	5.4	17	0	0	0	0.0	0	0	0	0
2018	TEN	13	5	37	466	12.6	55	1	0	0	0.0	0	0	0	0	0.0	0	0	1	1
2019	CLE	3	1	0	0	0.0	0	0	0	0	0.0	0	0	3	53	17.7	23	0	0	0
2020	CLE	3	0	0	0	0.0	0	0	0	0	0.0	0	0	0	0	0.0	0	0	0	0
Career		35	10	53	697	13.2	55	2	8	43	5.4	17	0	3	53	17.7	23	0	1	1

Postseason statistics
Season	Team	Games		Receiving					Rushing					Returning					Fumbles	
Season	Team	GP	GS	Rec	Yds	Avg	Lng	TD	Att	Yds	Avg	Lng	TD	Ret	Yds	Avg	Lng	TD	FUM	Lost
2017	TEN	2	0	2	9	4.5	5	0	–	–	–	–	–	–	–	–	–	–	–	–
Career		2	0	2	9	4.5	5	0	–	–	–	–	–	–	–	–	–	–	–	–

=== College ===
Year	Team	Games	Receiving				Rushing			
Year	Team	Games	Rec	Yards	Avg	Rec TD	Att	Yards	Avg	TD
2013	WKU	10	24	270	11.3	0	0	0	–	0
2014	WKU	12	45	767	17.0	7	1	11	11	0
2015	WKU	14	86	1,467	17.1	17	7	2	0.3	0
2016	WKU	14	98	1,730	17.7	17	6	36	6.0	0
Career		50	253	4,234	16.7	41	14	49	3.5	0
