= Malachi Corley =

American football player (born 2002)

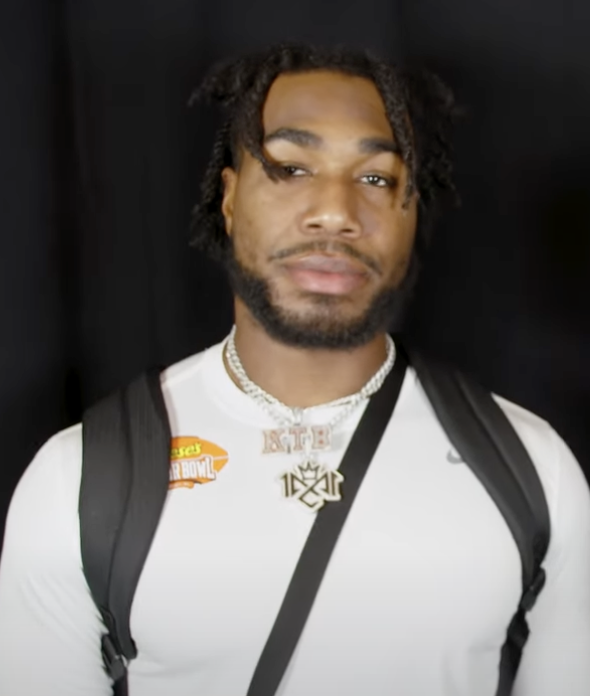
- Corley in 2024

No. 11 – Cleveland Browns
- Positions: Wide receiver, kick returner
- Roster status: Active

Personal information
- Born: March 21, 2002 (age 24); Orange City, Florida, U.S.
- Listed height: 5 ft 11 in (1.80 m)
- Listed weight: 215 lb (98 kg)

Career information
- High school: Campbellsville (Campbellsville, Kentucky)
- College: Western Kentucky (2020–2023)
- NFL draft: 2024: 3rd round, 65th overall pick

Career history
- New York Jets (2024); Cleveland Browns (2025–present)

Awards and highlights
- 2× First-team All-CUSA (2022, 2023)

Career NFL statistics as of Week 4, 2026
- Rushing yards: 153
- Rushing average: 7
- Receptions: 14
- Receiving yards: 95
- Return yards: 492
- Fumbles: 2
- Stats at Pro Football Reference

Malachi Corley (born March 21, 2002) is an American professional football wide receiver and kick returner for the Cleveland Browns of the National Football League (NFL). He played college football for the Western Kentucky Hilltoppers, earning all-conference honors in 2022 and 2023, and was selected by the Jets in the third round of the 2024 NFL draft.

== Early life ==
Corley initially grew up in Orange City, Florida. He later moved to Kentucky and attended Campbellsville High School, where he played basketball and football. As a junior, he had 95 tackles and two interceptions on defense as a cornerback while also rushing for 1,025 yards and nine touchdowns and catching 41 passes for 863 yards and 14 touchdowns on offense.

== College career ==
Corley was recruited to play cornerback at Western Kentucky, but was moved to wide receiver during preseason practices. He played in nine games and caught six passes for 65 yards during his freshman season at Western Kentucky, which did not count against his eligibility because of the coronavirus pandemic. He had 73 receptions for 691 yards and seven touchdowns in 2021. Corley was named first-team All-Conference USA as a redshirt sophomore after catching 101 passes for 1,295 yards and 11 touchdowns.

== Professional career ==
Pre-draft measurables
Height	Weight	Arm length	Hand span	Wingspan	40-yard dash	10-yard split	20-yard split	20-yard shuttle
5 ft 10 5/8 in (1.79 m)	207 lb (94 kg)	32 1/8 in (0.82 m)	9 1/8 in (0.23 m)	6 ft 3 1/2 in (1.92 m)	4.56 s	1.59 s	2.63 s	4.22 s
All values from Pro Day

=== New York Jets ===
Corley was selected by the New York Jets in the third round (65th overall) of the 2024 NFL draft. On July 18, 2024, Corley signed his four-year rookie contract with the Jets. He reportedly asked Davante Adams for one million dollars for Adams to acquire jersey number #17 after being offered $17,000. Adams reportedly refused and owner Woody Johnson forced Corley to give up the number.

On October 31, in the Jets’ Week 9 matchup against the Houston Texans, Corley let go of the ball just before the goal line after celebrating prematurely, ruling out his own 19-yard touchdown and turning the ball over as it went out of bounds in the end zone for a touchback. He appeared in nine games and started one as a rookie. He finished with three receptions for 16 yards.

On August 26, 2025, Corley was waived by the Jets as part of final roster cuts.

=== Cleveland Browns ===
On August 27, 2025, Corley signed with the Cleveland Browns' practice squad. He was signed to the active roster on September 30. On December 7, 2025, Corley sustained a concussion during the second quarter of a game against the Tennessee Titans.

On April 6, 2026, Corley re-signed with the Browns.

== NFL career statistics ==
Year	Team	Games		Receiving					Rushing					Returning					Fumbles	
Year	Team	GP	GS	Rec	Yds	Avg	Lng	TD	Att	Yds	Avg	Lng	TD	Ret	Yds	Avg	Lng	TD	Fum	Lost
2024	NYJ	9	1	3	16	5.3	10	0	2	26	13.0	18	0	0	0	0	0	0	1	1
2025	CLE	13	5	11	79	7.2	19	0	13	127	9.8	31	0	21	492	0	33	0	0	0
2026	CLE	4	0	0	0	0.0	0	0	0	0	0.0	0	0	0	0	0	0	0	1	1
Career		26	6	14	95	6.8	19	0	15	153	10.2	31	0	21	492	23.4	33	0	2	2

== Personal life ==
Corley's cousin is former NFL running back Jeff Demps, who played two games for the Tampa Bay Buccaneers in 2013.
