= Jonathan Dowling (American football) =

American football player (born 1991)

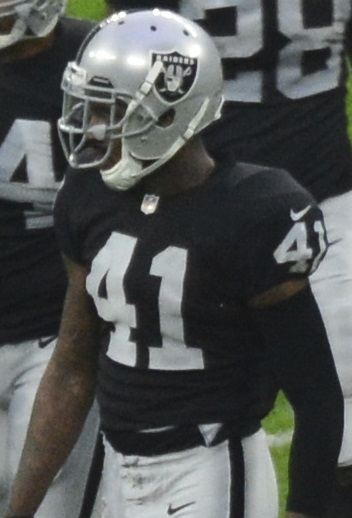
- Dowling with the Oakland Raiders in 2014

No. 41
- Position: Free safety

Personal information
- Born: December 8, 1991 (age 34); Bradenton, Florida, U.S.
- Listed height: 6 ft 3 in (1.91 m)
- Listed weight: 190 lb (86 kg)

Career information
- High school: Southeast (Bradenton)
- College: Western Kentucky
- NFL draft: 2014: 7th round, 247th overall pick

Career history
- Oakland Raiders (2014); Miami Dolphins (2015); Buffalo Bills (2015–2016); Toronto Argonauts (2018–2019)

Awards and highlights
- 2× First-team All-Sun Belt (2012, 2013)

Career NFL statistics
- Total tackles: 4
- Stats at Pro Football Reference

Jonathan Dowling (born December 8, 1991) is an American former professional football player who was a safety in the National Football League (NFL). He played college football for the Western Kentucky Hilltoppers and was selected by the Oakland Raiders in the seventh round of the 2014 NFL draft.

== Early life ==
Dowling attended Southeast High School. He participated in the 2010 Under Armour All-American Game along with being selected to the Top 150 Dream Team by PrepStar Magazine. He had 58 tackles, 14 interceptions in his senior season in high school. He was selected named 4A FSWA All-State team. He was ranked as s four-star prospect by both Scout.com and Rivals.com. He also was ranked as the 5th best safety prospect in the country by Scout.com.

== College career ==
He spent his freshman season at Florida where he played special teams until he transferred to Western Kentucky. After his junior season, On December 15, 2013, it was announced he will forgo his senior season to enter the 2014 NFL draft. During his time at Western Kentucky, He finished with a total 135 tackles, 9 Iinterceptions. 20 pass deflections and 8 forced fumbles.

== Professional career ==
=== Oakland Raiders ===
Dowling was selected by the Oakland Raiders in the seventh round (247th overall) of the 2014 NFL draft. The pick used to draft him was acquired from the Seattle Seahawks in a trade for Terrelle Pryor. On August 29, 2015, he was released by the Raiders for reasons that had to do with "maturity" rather than his field play.

=== Miami Dolphins ===
On September 9, 2015, Dowling was signed to the Miami Dolphins' practice squad. On October 15, 2015, the Dolphins signed him to the active roster.

=== Buffalo Bills ===
On December 23, 2015, the Buffalo Bills signed Dowling to their practice squad.

Dowling tore his ACL in the Bills' third preseason game in 2016 and was placed on injured reserve.

On June 1, 2017, Dowling was released by the Bills.

=== Toronto Argonauts ===
Dowling signed with the Toronto Argonauts of the Canadian Football League on April 6, 2018. He spent time on the active roster and practice roster during the 2018 and 2019 seasons. He was released on February 3, 2020.

== Filmography ==
2013-2014 Teen Titans Go! as Steve Henry
