= Houchens Industries–L. T. Smith Stadium =

Stadium in Kentucky, United States

Houchens Industries–LT Smith Stadium
- "The Houch"
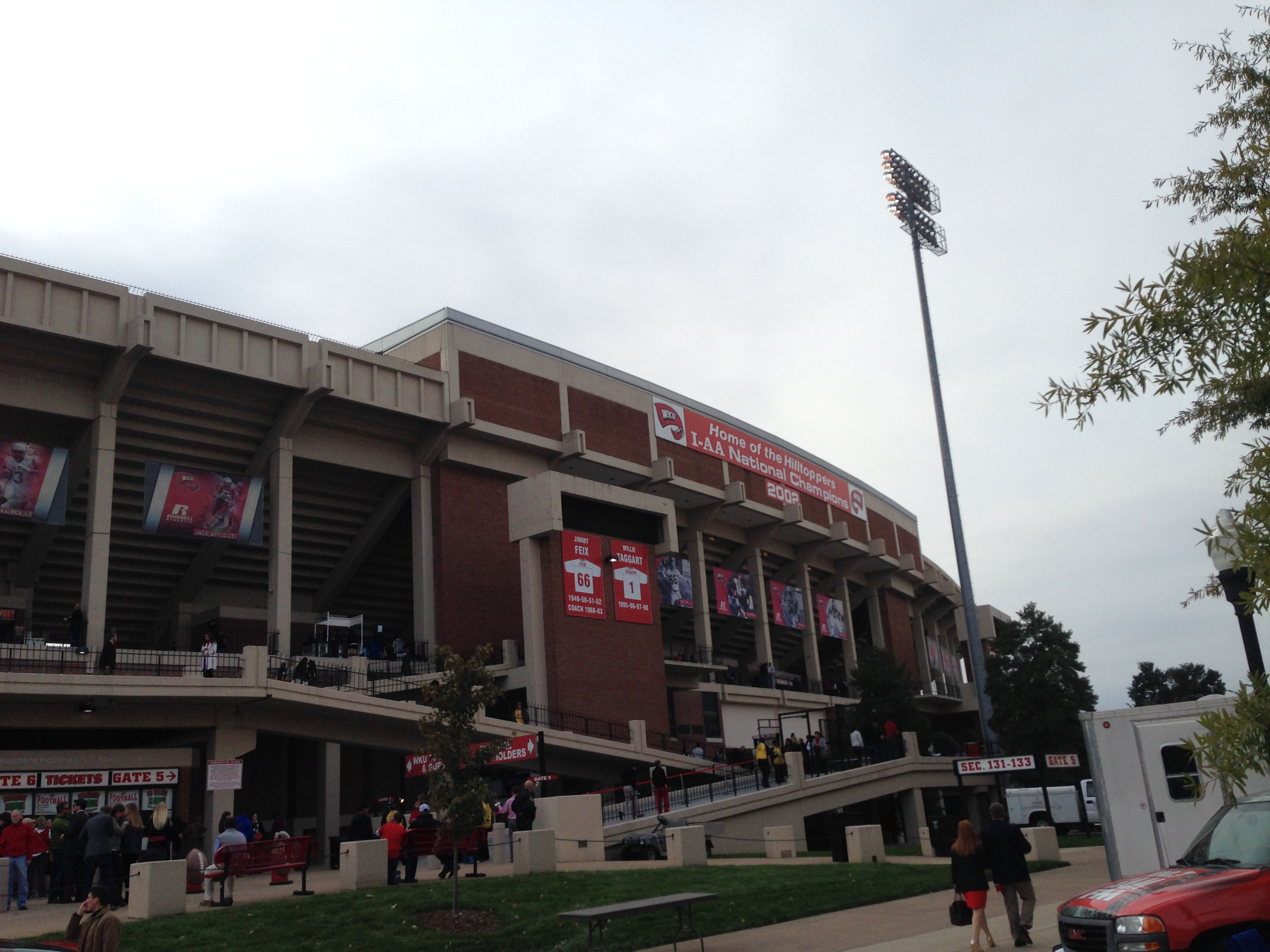
- Outside of LT Smith Stadium, October 2013

- Location in Kentucky Location in the United States
- Location: Bowling Green, KY
- Coordinates: 36°59′5″N 86°27′34″W
- Owner: Western Kentucky University
- Operator: Western Kentucky University
- Capacity: 19,250 (1968–1989); 17,500 (1990–2007); 22,113 (2008–present)
- Surface: FieldTurf (2009–present); Astroplay (2002–2008); Grass (1968–2001)
- Record attendance: 25,171 (Sept. 25, 2021)

Construction
- Opened: 1968
- Renovated: 2008
- Cost: $2.7 million $50 million (renovation)
- Architects: Ryan Associated Architects; Heery International & Taylor-Whitney Architects (renovation)

Tenant
- Western Kentucky Hilltoppers (NCAA) 1968–present

Houchens Industries–L. T. Smith Stadium at Jimmy Feix Field is a 22,000-seat stadium in Bowling Green, in the U.S. state of Kentucky. It is home to the Western Kentucky University Hilltoppers football team.

== History ==
When the stadium was built in 1968 it seated 19,250 fans. The facility was expanded to a seating capacity of 22,000 in a project that was completed in 2008. This was planned to prepare for the Hilltoppers' move to the highest level of NCAA football competition, Division I FBS (formerly known as Division I-A), completed in 2009. However, the facility remains one of the smallest stadiums in the FBS.

=== Renovations ===
A 1989 renovation reduced the seating capacity to 17,500 seats. Lights were installed in 1987 and an Astroplay playing surface was installed in 2002. On July 19, 2007, WKU reported that Houchens Industries, a long-time corporate supporter of WKU, made a $5 million commitment to an expansion and renovation project for the school's football stadium. In honor of the gift, WKU added Houchens Industries to the name of L. T. Smith Stadium. Today, the stadium is now titled as Houchens Industries–L. T. Smith Stadium.

== Notable events ==
Smith Stadium has been the site of marching band competitions, high school football games, the university's graduation ceremonies and the Special Olympics. Starting in 2009, it became the site of Kentucky's high school football championship games, which had been previously held at the current Cardinal Stadium on the campus of the University of Louisville. Although the contract with the Kentucky High School Athletic Association (KHSAA) had been extended through 2018, the KHSAA decided to move the championships away from WKU in 2017. One of the reasons cited was the Hilltoppers' recent football success, specifically their hosting of the 2015 and 2016 Conference USA championship games, which forced the rescheduling of several high school championship games on short notice. Accordingly, the 2017 and 2018 KHSAA championships were moved to the University of Kentucky's Kroger Field.

== Record crowds ==
Highest attendance at Houchens Industries–L. T. Smith Stadium
Rank	Attendance	Opponent	Date
1	25,171	Indiana	Sept. 25, 2021
2	23,674	Vanderbilt	Sept. 24, 2016
3	23,252	Southern Miss	Sept. 22, 2012
4	22,323	Louisiana–Monroe	Oct. 20, 2012
5	22,297	Murray State	Sept. 21, 2013
6	20,973	Morgan State	Sept. 29, 2018
7	20,811	Marshall	Sept. 29, 2018
8	20,772	Indiana	Sept. 18, 2010
9	20,568	South Florida	Sept. 12, 2009
10	20,428	Eastern Kentucky	Oct. 26, 1968

Homecoming 2012:

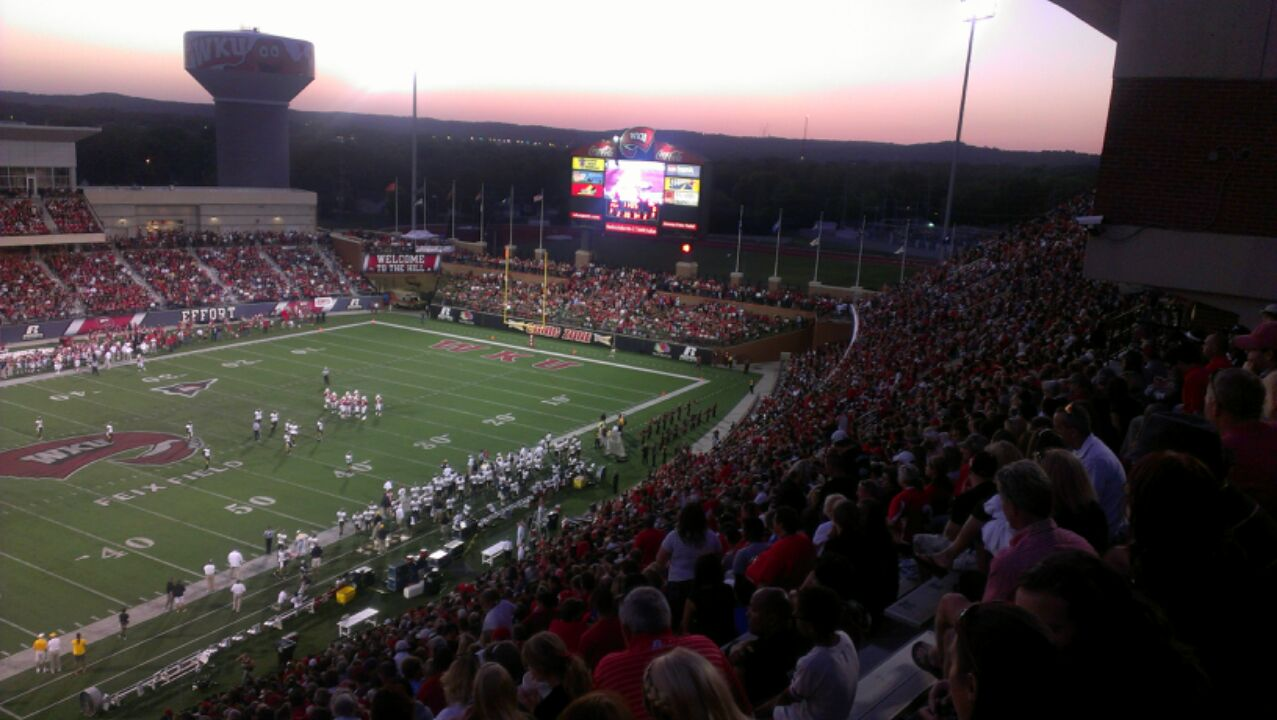

Homecoming 2013:

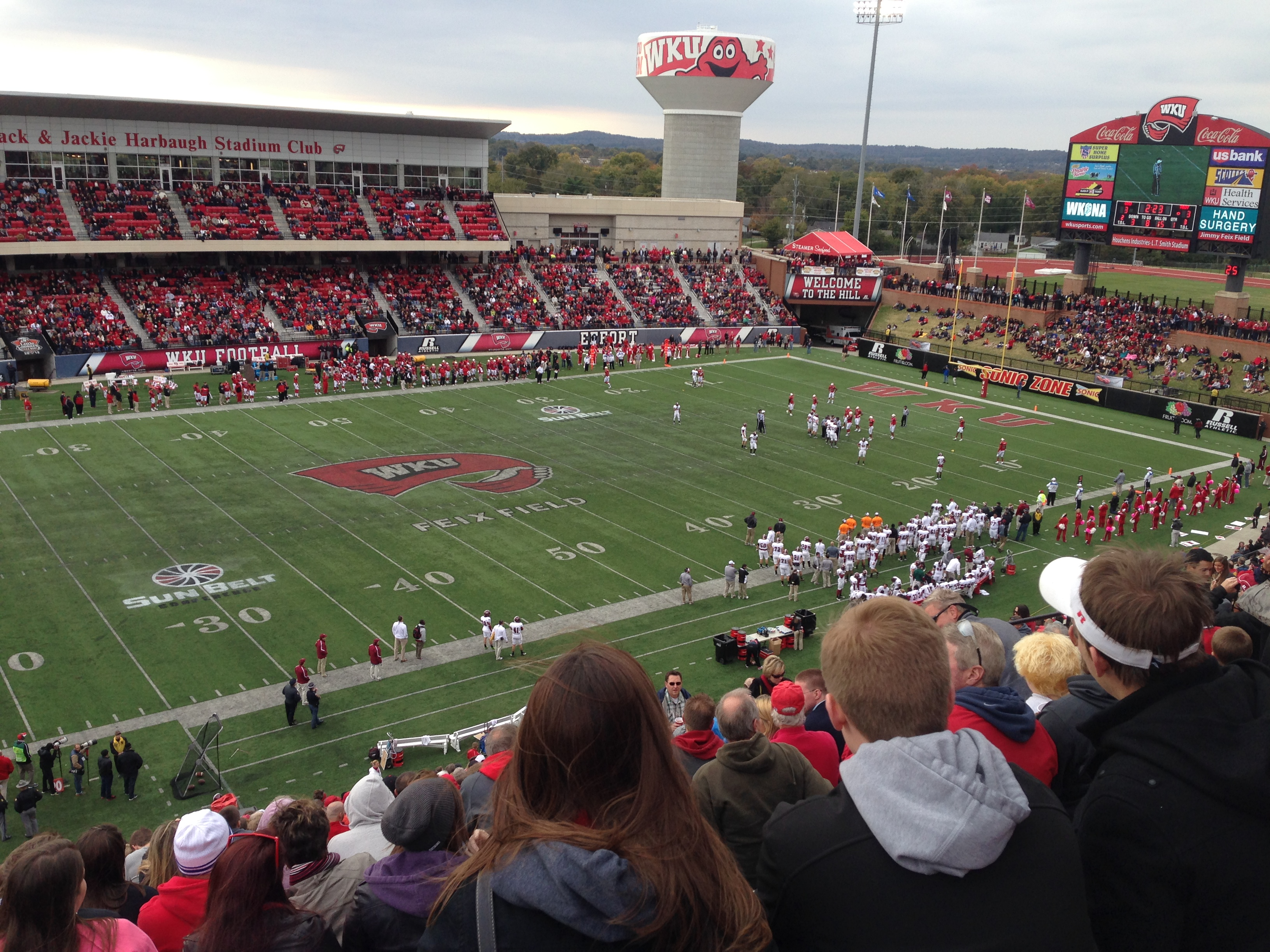

== See also ==
- List of NCAA Division I FBS football stadiums
