= 100 Miles of Hate =

American college football rivalry

- Middle Tennessee Blue Raiders Western Kentucky Hilltoppers
- Sport: Football
- First meeting: October 10, 1914; Middle Tennessee, 47–0
- Latest meeting: November 7, 2026; Middle Tennessee, 51–42

Statistics
- Total meetings: 76
- All-time series: Western Kentucky, 39–36–1 (.520)
- Largest victory: Western Kentucky, 54–0 (1978)
- Longest win streak: Western Kentucky, 7 (1928–1934), (2019–2025)
- Longest unbeaten streak: Western Kentucky, 10 (1922–1934)
- Current win streak: Middle Tennessee, 1 (2026–present)

Locations of MTSU and WKU

100 Miles of Hate is the unofficial nickname given to the American college football rivalry game between the Middle Tennessee Blue Raiders football team of Middle Tennessee State University and Western Kentucky Hilltoppers football team of Western Kentucky University. Fans began to refer to the game as "100 Miles of Hate" when the rivalry resumed in 2007 after a 16-year hiatus.

== History ==
The universities, which first played each other in 1914, are separated by about 100 miles (161 km) along U.S. Route 231. For much of their football histories, they have been conference rivals in leagues such as the Ohio Valley Conference and Sun Belt Conference. The rivalry was on hiatus from 1991 to 2007, resuming after Western Kentucky transitioned to Football Bowl Subdivision play and became a football member of the Sun Belt Conference in 2009 (Western Kentucky had been a non-football member of that conference since 1982). After Middle Tennessee left the Sun Belt for Conference USA (CUSA) in 2013, the rivalry again went on hiatus. However, the rivalry was renewed in 2014 when Western Kentucky joined CUSA. The match up usually generates a substantial amount of excitement within the respective fan bases, and tensions are usually high in every meeting.

== Game results ==
Middle Tennessee victories	Western Kentucky victories	Tie games

No.	Date	Location	Winner	Score
1	October 10, 1914	Murfreesboro, TN	Middle Tennessee	47–0
2	November 12, 1915	Bowling Green, KY	Middle Tennessee	47–0
3	November 11, 1921	Murfreesboro, TN	Middle Tennessee	17–7
4	October 6, 1922	Bowling Green, KY	Western Kentucky	31–0
5	October 18, 1924	Bowling Green, KY	Western Kentucky	44–0
6	October 17, 1925	Murfreesboro, TN	Tie	7–7
7	October 20, 1928	Murfreesboro, TN	Western Kentucky	19–0
8	September 28, 1929	Bowling Green, KY	Western Kentucky	19–0
9	October 18, 1930	Bowling Green, KY	Western Kentucky	13–7
10	October 17, 1931	Bowling Green, KY	Western Kentucky	13–0
11	October 15, 1932	Murfreesboro, TN	Western Kentucky	21–7
12	September 30, 1933	Bowling Green, KY	Western Kentucky	32–0
13	October 27, 1934	Murfreesboro, TN	Western Kentucky	14–0
14	October 26, 1935	Murfreesboro, TN	Middle Tennessee	7–0
15	October 17, 1936	Bowling Green, KY	Middle Tennessee	9–0
16	October 28, 1939	Bowling Green, KY	Western Kentucky	26–2
17	October 26, 1940	Bowling Green, KY	Western Kentucky	13–0
18	October 3, 1941	Murfreesboro, TN	Western Kentucky	15–7
19	September 20, 1952	Bowling Green, KY	Western Kentucky	33–19
20	September 19, 1953	Murfreesboro, TN	Middle Tennessee	13–0
21	October 2, 1954	Bowling Green, KY	Western Kentucky	7–6
22	October 1, 1955	Murfreesboro, TN	Middle Tennessee	25–13
23	September 29, 1956	Bowling Green, KY	Middle Tennessee	7–6
24	October 5, 1957	Murfreesboro, TN	Middle Tennessee	26–7
25	October 4, 1958	Bowling Green, KY	Middle Tennessee	10–7
26	October 3, 1959	Murfreesboro, TN	Middle Tennessee	37–2
27	October 1, 1960	Bowling Green, KY	Western Kentucky	20–13
28	September 30, 1961	Murfreesboro, TN	Middle Tennessee	14–6
29	September 29, 1962	Bowling Green, KY	Middle Tennessee	17–0
30	October 5, 1963	Murfreesboro, TN	Western Kentucky	16–6
31	October 3, 1964	Bowling Green, KY	Middle Tennessee	9–0
32	October 2, 1965	Murfreesboro, TN	Middle Tennessee	21–0
33	October 1, 1966	Bowling Green, KY	Middle Tennessee	33–9
34	November 4, 1967	Murfreesboro, TN	Middle Tennessee	16–14
35	November 9, 1968	Bowling Green, KY	Western Kentucky	43–2
36	November 8, 1969	Murfreesboro, TN	Western Kentucky	28–14
37	November 7, 1970	Bowling Green, KY	Middle Tennessee	17–13
38	November 6, 1971	Murfreesboro, TN	Middle Tennessee	27–13
39	November 4, 1972	Bowling Green, KY	Middle Tennessee	21–17

No.	Date	Location	Winner	Score
40	November 3, 1973	Murfreesboro, TN	Western Kentucky	42–8
41	November 9, 1974	Bowling Green, KY	Western Kentucky	36–10
42	November 8, 1975	Murfreesboro, TN	Western Kentucky	24–10
43	November 6, 1976	Bowling Green, KY	Western Kentucky	38–7
44	November 5, 1977	Murfreesboro, TN	Middle Tennessee	21–19
45	November 4, 1978	Bowling Green, KY	Western Kentucky	54–0
46	November 3, 1979	Murfreesboro, TN	Western Kentucky	17–12
47	November 8, 1980	Bowling Green, KY	Western Kentucky	30–15
48	November 14, 1981	Murfreesboro, TN	Middle Tennessee	31–17
49	November 6, 1982	Bowling Green, KY	Middle Tennessee	31–16
50	November 5, 1983	Murfreesboro, TN	Middle Tennessee	26–7
51	November 3, 1984	Bowling Green, KY	Middle Tennessee	45–24
52	November 9, 1985	Murfreesboro, TN	Middle Tennessee	41–9
53	September 26, 1987	Bowling Green, KY	Western Kentucky	28–16
54	September 17, 1988	Murfreesboro, TN	Middle Tennessee	13–10
55	September 16, 1989	Bowling Green, KY	Western Kentucky	31–16
56	September 22, 1990	Murfreesboro, TN	Middle Tennessee	20–7
57	October 5, 1991	Bowling Green, KY	Middle Tennessee	23–21
58	September 20, 2007	Murfreesboro, TN	Western Kentucky	20–17
59	November 15, 2008	Bowling Green, KY	Middle Tennessee	21–10
60	October 24, 2009	Murfreesboro, TN	Middle Tennessee	62–24
61	November 20, 2010	Bowling Green, KY	Middle Tennessee	27–26
62	October 6, 2011	Murfreesboro, TN	Western Kentucky	36–33
63	November 1, 2012	Bowling Green, KY	Middle Tennessee	34–29
64	September 13, 2014	Murfreesboro, TN	Middle Tennessee	50–47
65	October 10, 2015	Bowling Green, KY	Western Kentucky	58–28
66	October 15, 2016	Murfreesboro, TN	Western Kentucky	44–43
67	November 17, 2017	Bowling Green, KY	Western Kentucky	41–38
68	November 2, 2018	Murfreesboro, TN	Middle Tennessee	29–10
69	November 30, 2019	Bowling Green, KY	Western Kentucky	31–26
70	October 3, 2020	Murfreesboro, TN	Western Kentucky	20–17
71	November 6, 2021	Bowling Green, KY	Western Kentucky	48–21
72	October 15, 2022	Murfreesboro, TN	Western Kentucky	35–17
73	September 28, 2023	Bowling Green, KY	Western Kentucky	31–10
74	September 14, 2024	Murfreesboro, TN	Western Kentucky	49–21
75	November 15, 2025	Bowling Green, KY	Western Kentucky	42–26
76	November 7, 2026	Murfreesboro, TN	Middle Tennessee	51–42
Series: Western Kentucky leads 39–36–1

== See also ==
- List of NCAA college football rivalry games
