= Brandon Doughty =

American football player (born 1991)

No. 6
- Position: Quarterback

Personal information
- Born: October 6, 1991 (age 35); Davie, Florida, U.S.
- Listed height: 6 ft 3 in (1.91 m)
- Listed weight: 220 lb (100 kg)

Career information
- High school: North Broward Prep (Coconut Creek, Florida)
- College: Western Kentucky (2010–2015)
- NFL draft: 2016: 7th round, 223rd overall pick

Career history
- Miami Dolphins (2016–2017); Arizona Cardinals (2018)*
- * Offseason or practice squad member only

Awards and highlights
- Sammy Baugh Trophy (2014); 2× C-USA Most Valuable Player (2014, 2015); First-team All-C-USA (2015); Second-team All-C-USA (2014); 2× FBS passing yards leader (2014, 2015)
- Stats at Pro Football Reference

Other information

Signature
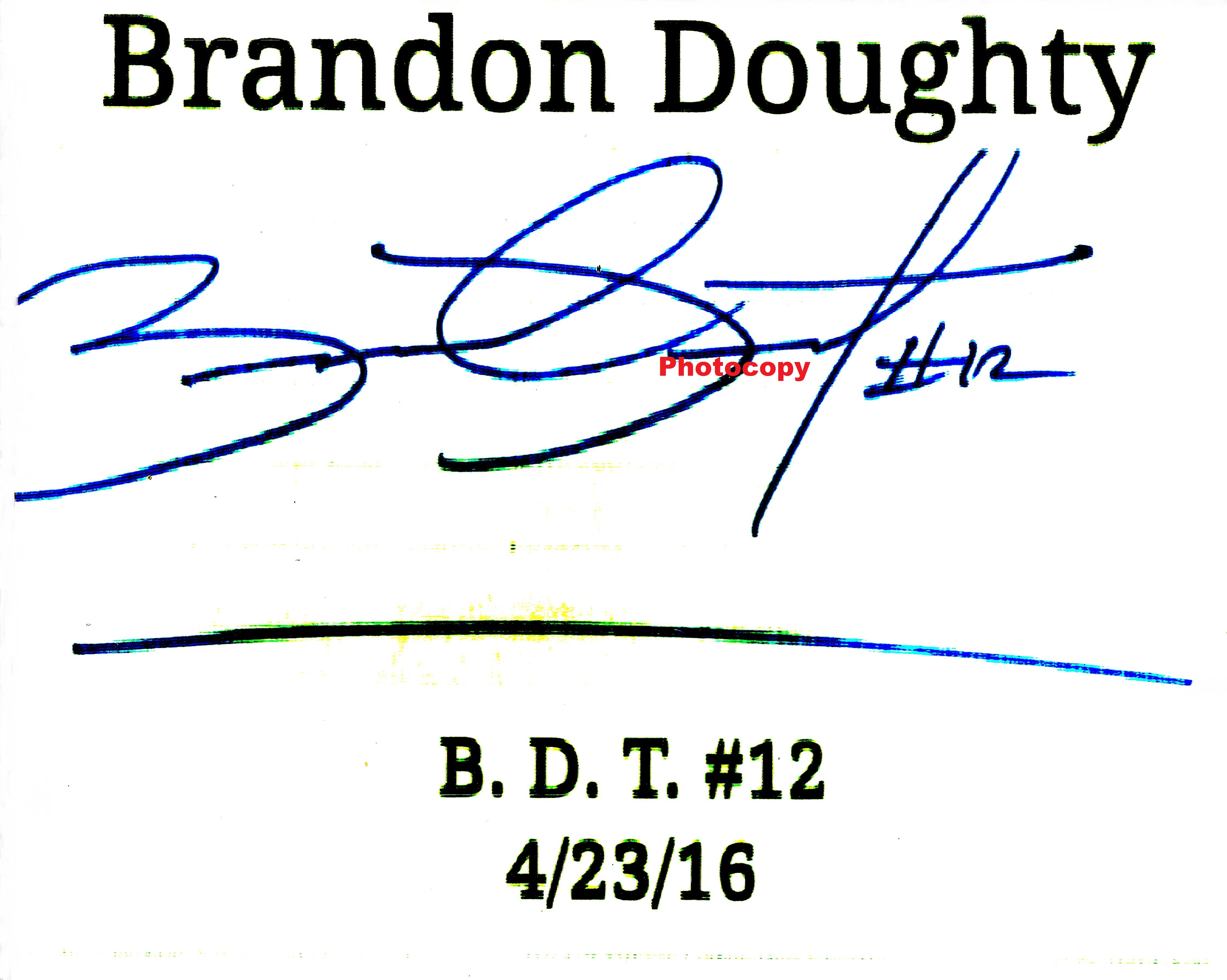

Brandon Doughty (born October 6, 1991) is an American former football quarterback. He played college football for the Western Kentucky Hilltoppers and was their starting quarterback from 2013 to 2015. He was selected by the Miami Dolphins in the seventh round of the 2016 NFL draft.

== Early life ==
Doughty attended North Broward Preparatory School in Coconut Creek, Florida. During his career as the starting quarterback he passed for 2,885 yards with 23 touchdowns and 12 interceptions. Rated as a three-star recruit by both ESPN and Rivals.com, Doughty was named an FACA North-South All-Star, a Dade-Broward All-Star and was named to the First-team All-Broward County by the Miami Herald and the Sun-Sentinel.

Originally, Doughty had committed to Florida Atlantic before signing with WKU for the 2010 recruiting class.

College recruiting
Name	Hometown	School	Height	Weight	40^{‡}	Commit date
Brandon Doughty; QB	Coconut Creek, FL	North Broward	6 ft 1 in (1.85 m)	220 lb (100 kg)	Jan 22, 2010	
Brandon Doughty; QB	Recruit ratings: Scout: Rivals: 247Sports: ESPN: (76)					
Overall recruit ranking: Scout: #88 QB 247Sports: #6 RB ESPN: #74 ATH
Note: In many cases, Scout, Rivals, 247Sports, On3, and ESPN may conflict in their listings of height and weight.; In these cases, the average was taken. ESPN grades are on a 100-point scale.; Sources: "Rivals.com 2010 Western Kentucky Football Commitments". Rivals.; "Scout.com 2010 Western Kentucky Football Commits". Scout.; "ESPN 2010 Western Kentucky Football Commits". ESPN.; "Scout.com Team Recruiting Rankings". Scout.; "2010 Team Ranking". Rivals.com.; "247sports.com 2010 Western Kentucky Football Commits". 247Sports.

== College career ==
=== 2010 ===
Doughty redshirted the 2010 season.

=== 2011 ===
Doughty made his college football debut for the Hilltoppers in a 40–14 loss to Navy. Making a relief appearance, Doughty completed 12 of 21 passes for 102 yards, no touchdowns and an interception. Still, his performance was enough to earn him the starting job the next week at home against Indiana State. However, after only three plays (and one completion for four yards), Doughty suffered a knee injury which ended his freshman season.

=== 2012 ===
As a redshirt sophomore, Doughty saw limited action as a relief quarterback, appearing in two games against Austin Peay and Southern Miss. In these games, Doughty completed one of three pass attempts for seven yards.

=== 2013 ===
Regaining his starting job as a redshirt junior, Doughty set many records during the 2013 season. Among the new records were single-season passing yards (2,857), single-season completion percentage (65.8), and single-game completions and passing yards (29 and 386, respectively, both in a 32–26 defeat on October 26 against Troy). Overall, Doughty finished the 2013 season completing 246 of 374 attempts with 14 touchdowns and 14 interceptions.

=== 2014 ===
2014 was the Hilltoppers' first season as a member of Conference USA (C-USA). Doughty broke his previous records for single-game completions and passing yards (46 and 569, respectively, in the season-opening 59–31 victory over Bowling Green). Playing only one game with a completion percentage below 58.3 or a passer rating lower than 119.9 (that game being a 59–10 defeat on November 10 to Louisiana Tech), Doughty and WKU finished the regular season with a 7–5 overall record (4–4 in C-USA).

On December 10, Doughty was named C-USA's Most Valuable Player, the same day it was announced that the NCAA had granted him a sixth year of eligibility.

The next day, on December 11, Doughty was announced as the winner of the 2014 Sammy Baugh Trophy, becoming the first Hilltopper and only the third quarterback from C-USA to do so.

On December 24, Doughty led the Hilltoppers to a 49–48 victory over Central Michigan in the 2014 Bahamas Bowl, completing 31 of 42 pass attempts for 486 yards, five touchdown passes and no interceptions en route to being named the Offensive MVP for the game.

Overall, for the season Doughty completed 375 of 552 passing attempts for an NCAA Division I Football Bowl Subdivision (FBS)-leading 4,830 yards (16th all-time in the FBS) and 49 touchdowns (a C-USA football single-season record and tied for sixth all-time in the FBS) and only ten interceptions, picking up a quarterback rating of 167.1.

=== 2015 ===
Doughty completed 388 of 540 passes for 5,055 yards with 48 touchdowns. His 5,055 yards in the 2015 season broke his previous record for most yards in a single season. From the beginning of the 2014 season to the end of the 2015 season he threw for 97 touchdowns, more than any other quarterback in a two-year span in NCAA history. Doughty finished his career in the top 25 in NCAA history for career passing yards, passing touchdowns, and completion percentage. Doughty played in the 2016 East–West Shrine Game prior to the 2016 NFL draft.

=== College statistics ===
Year	Team	Games		Passing								Rushing					
Year	Team	GP	GS	Cmp	Att	Pct	Yds	TD	Int	Lng	Y/G	Att	Yds	Avg	Lng	TD	Y/G
2011	Western Kentucky	2	1	13	22	59.1	106	0	1	21	53.0	2	−2	−1.0	8	0	−1.0
2012	Western Kentucky	2	0	1	3	33.3	7	0	0	7	3.5	0	0	0.0	0	0	0.0
2013	Western Kentucky	12	12	246	374	65.8	2,857	14	14	60	238.1	34	−109	−3.2	10	0	−9.1
2014	Western Kentucky	13	13	375	552	67.9	4,830	49	10	75	371.5	39	−52	−1.3	15	2	−4.0
2015	Western Kentucky	14	14	388	540	71.9	5,055	48	9	75	361.1	0	0	0.0	0	0	0.0
Totals		43	40	1,023	1491	68.6	12,855	111	34	75	269.0	75	−163	−2.2	15	2	−6.0

== Professional career ==
Pre-draft measurables
Height	Weight	40-yard dash	10-yard split	20-yard split	20-yard shuttle	Three-cone drill	Vertical jump	Broad jump
6 ft 3 in (1.91 m)	213 lb (97 kg)	5.22 s	1.81 s	3.01 s	4.52 s	7.49 s	27 in (0.69 m)	8 ft 7 in (2.62 m)
All values from NFL Combine

=== Miami Dolphins ===
Doughty was selected in the seventh round of the 2016 NFL draft by the Miami Dolphins with the 223rd pick, acquired in a trade that sent Jamar Taylor to the Cleveland Browns. He was released by the Dolphins on September 14, 2016. He was signed to the team's practice squad on September 16. He signed a reserve/future contract with the Dolphins on January 10, 2017.

On September 2, 2017, Doughty was waived by the Dolphins and was signed to the practice squad the next day. He signed a reserve/future contract with the Dolphins on January 1, 2018. On April 4, Doughty was waived by the Dolphins.

=== Arizona Cardinals ===
On April 5, 2018, Doughty was claimed off waivers by the Arizona Cardinals. He was waived on May 7.

== See also ==
- List of college football yearly passing leaders
- List of Division I FBS passing touchdown leaders
