= Willie Taggart =

American football player and coach (born 1976)

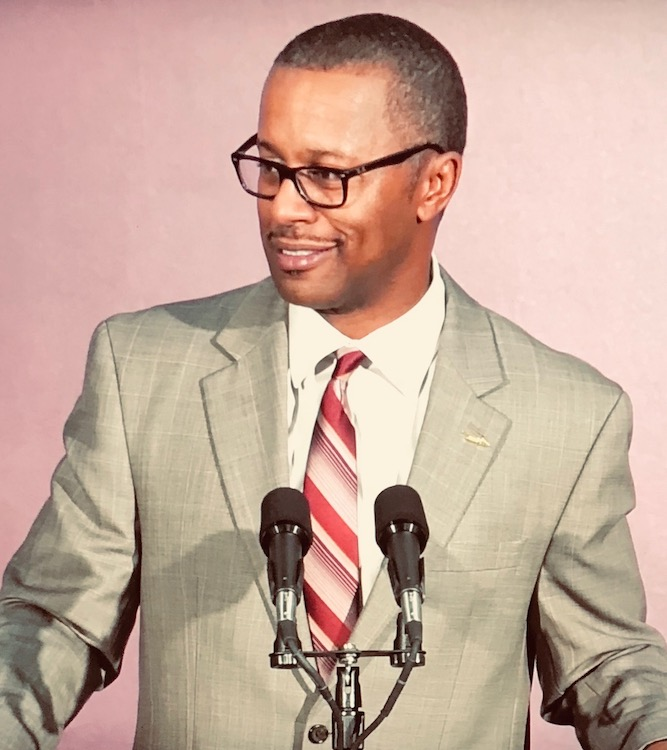
- Taggart at a press conference at Florida State in 2017

New York Giants
- Title: Running backs coach

Personal information
- Born: August 27, 1976 (age 50); Bradenton, Florida, U.S.

Career information
- Position: Quarterback
- College: Western Kentucky

Career history
- Western Kentucky (1999–2006); Wide receivers coach (1999); Quarterbacks coach (2000); Co-offensive coordinator & quarterbacks coach (2001–2002); Assistant head coach & quarterbacks coach (2003–2006); Stanford (2007–2009) Running backs coach; Western Kentucky (2010–2012) Head coach; South Florida (2013–2016) Head coach; Oregon (2017) Head coach; Florida State (2018–2019) Head coach; Florida Atlantic (2020–2022) Head coach; Baltimore Ravens (2023–2025); Running backs coach (2023–2024); Assistant head coach & running backs coach (2025); New York Giants (2026–present) Running backs coach

Awards and highlights
- Western Kentucky Hilltoppers Jersey No. 1 retired

Head coaching record
- Regular season: NCAA: 71–80 (.470)
- Postseason: NCAA: 0–2 (.000)
- Career: NCAA: 71–82 (.464)

Willie Author Taggart (born August 27, 1976) is an American professional football coach who is the running backs coach for the New York Giants of the National Football League (NFL). He has held the head coach position at five NCAA Division I Football Bowl Subdivision programs: Western Kentucky (2009 to 2012 seasons); South Florida (2013 to 2016); Oregon (2017); Florida State (2018 and part of the 2019 season); and Florida Atlantic (2020 to 2022). At all five schools, he was the first African-American to be hired as the head coach.

== Playing career ==
=== High school career ===
Taggart was a prep standout at Manatee High School in Bradenton, Florida, where he was a first team all-state and all-conference selection as a senior after guiding the Hurricanes to the state 5A Championship game. He helped lead the football team to the state title his junior season and helped the school post a 26–4 record during that two-year span, while recording more than 3,000 yards passing and 975 yards on the ground.

=== College career ===
After high school, Taggart became a star quarterback for the Western Kentucky University (WKU) Hilltoppers from 1995 through 1998, being one of only three WKU players in the previous 50 years to be a four-year starter at the position and one of only four Hilltoppers players to have his jersey retired. In each of his last two collegiate seasons, he was a finalist for the prestigious Walter Payton Award, which is an honor given annually to the top offensive player in I-AA football. Taggart finished fourth in the balloting in 1997 and seventh as a senior the following year. An All-American as a senior, he was also the 1998 I-AA Independents’ Offensive Player of the Year. Taggart was recruited to WKU by Jim Harbaugh to play for his father, Jack Harbaugh.

== Coaching career ==
=== Early coaching years ===
After graduating from WKU in 1998, Taggart stayed on at the school as an assistant through 2006, serving as co-offensive coordinator under Jack Harbaugh on the Hilltoppers' 2002 Division I-AA national champions. He also worked alongside Harbaugh's son Jim, who had been an unpaid certified assistant coach under his father in the final years of his NFL career.

When Jim Harbaugh was named head coach of the Stanford Cardinal football team following the 2006 season, he hired Taggart as his running backs coach. Taggart served in that role for the next two seasons, developing Doak Walker Award winner and Heisman runner-up Toby Gerhart into a star during that time. The younger Harbaugh also gave Taggart responsibility for recruiting in Taggart's home state of Florida, Georgia, Kentucky, and Riverside County, California.

=== Western Kentucky (2010–2012) ===
In 2010, Taggart left his position at Stanford as the running backs coach in order to become the head football coach of his alma-mater, Western Kentucky. In their first year under Taggart, the Hilltoppers broke a 26-game losing streak while finishing the season with a record of 2–10.

In 2011, Taggart led WKU to a 7–5 season, where the Hilltoppers lost the first 4 games of the season, but then won 7 of their last 8 games. Although having a winning record, they were not invited to a bowl game that year. In 2012, Taggart led WKU once again to a bowl-eligible record of 7–5. The Hilltoppers accepted an invitation to play Central Michigan in the Little Caesars Bowl on December 26, 2012, on ESPN. However, Taggart did not coach in this bowl game having already accepted the head coaching position of the South Florida Bulls on December 7, 2012.

=== South Florida (2013–2016) ===
On December 7, 2012, Taggart took over as head coach at the University of South Florida in his native Tampa Bay area.

In his first season, Taggart led the Bulls to a 2–10 season. The following season, Taggart's team doubled the number of wins and finished with a 4–8 record. During the off-season, Taggart made several personnel changes, including replacing the offensive and defensive coordinators. The change of schemes as well as the development of his first two recruiting classes provided the team with much needed energy and depth of positions.

In 2015, led by conference leaders quarterback Quinton Flowers and running back Marlon Mack, the Bulls started the season 1–3 before finishing the regular season with a record of 8–5 and earning bowl eligibility for the first time in five years. The Bulls lost to WKU in the Miami Beach Bowl.

In 2016, the Bulls went 10–2 and won a share of the AAC East division. This was the Bulls first double digit win season in school history.

=== Oregon (2017) ===
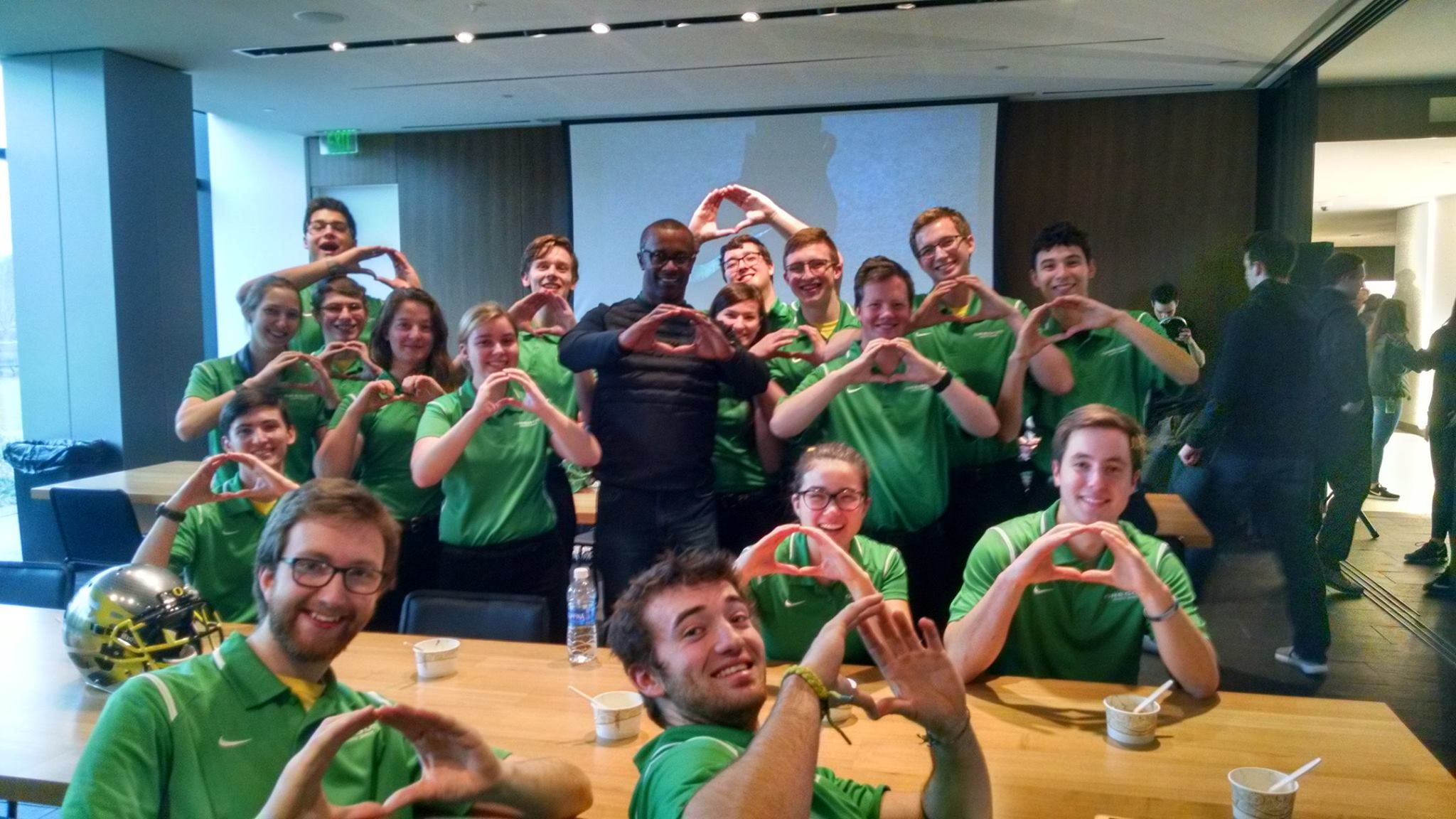
Taggart with the Green Garter Band

On December 7, 2016, the University of Oregon announced Taggart as the Ducks' new head coach, replacing the fired Mark Helfrich.

In January 2017, three Oregon football players were hospitalized after grueling military-style workouts. Multiple sources described the workouts to the Oregonian as "akin to military basic training, with one said to include up to an hour of continuous push-ups and up-downs." Taggart personally visited the ill and hospitalized players to wish them a speedy recovery. "I have visited with the three young men involved in the incidents in the past few days and I have been in constant contact with their families, offering my sincere apologies,” Taggart said in the statement. “As the head football coach, I hold myself responsible for all of our football-related activities and the safety of our students must come first. I have addressed the issue with our strength and conditioning staff, and I fully support the actions taken today by the university. I want to thank our medical staff and doctors for caring for all of our young men, and I want to apologize to the university, our students, alumni and fans.”

Taggart's hiring at Oregon drew attention to the low number of African American head coaches in major college football (14 out of 128 schools). The hiring came several years after Oregon’s passing of House Bill 3118, which requires state-funded schools to interview qualified minority candidates for top coaching and athletic administration positions.

Oregon went 7-5 overall and 4-5 in the Pac-12 in 2017 with Taggart at the reins. The Ducks beat Nebraska, Arizona and rival Oregon State. They were bested by UCLA, Stanford, Washington State, and suffered a 38-3 blowout loss to Washington. Additionally, the Ducks lost The Las Vegas Bowl to Boise State on December 16 with Mario Cristobal at the helm after Taggart accepted the position at Florida State.

=== Florida State (2018–2019) ===
On December 5, 2017, Taggart accepted the head coaching job at Florida State, replacing Jimbo Fisher. In his first season, the Seminoles finished 5-7, their first losing season on the field since 1976, Bobby Bowden's first year. They were not invited to a bowl for the first time since the end of the 1981 season, breaking the longest active bowl appearance streak in FBS. Florida State fans were not used to staying home for bowl season, and there were numerous calls for Taggart's firing. However, school president John E. Thrasher and athletic director Dave Coburn voiced confidence in Taggart.

Following a 4-5 start to the 2019 season, Taggart was fired mid-season in November 2019. For the removal of Taggart, Florida State had to pay over $20M in buyouts, including close to $18M to Taggart after the firing and over $4M paid to Oregon at his hiring ($3M to end Taggart's contract with Oregon and an additional $1.3M that Oregon still owed South Florida for hiring Taggart away in 2016).

=== Florida Atlantic (2020–2022) ===
On December 11, 2019, two days after Lane Kiffin resigned as head football coach at Florida Atlantic University and accepted the head coaching position at Ole Miss, Florida Atlantic announced the hiring of Taggart as the school's next head coach. The 5-year contract was to pay Taggart $750,000 annually with a $3M buyout if Taggart leaves before December 1, 2022. On November 26, 2022, Taggart was fired by Florida Atlantic after a 32–31 overtime loss to Western Kentucky. Taggart only went to one bowl game during his tenure with the Owls, a 25-10 loss to the Memphis Tigers in the Montgomery Bowl in his first season, which was 2020.

=== Baltimore Ravens (2023–2025) ===
On February 22, 2023, Taggart was hired as the running backs coach for the Baltimore Ravens.

=== New York Giants (2026–present) ===
On January 27, 2026, Taggart was hired to serve as the running backs coach for the New York Giants under new head coach John Harbaugh.

== Personal life ==
Taggart and his wife, Taneshia, have two sons, Willie Jr. and Jackson, and one daughter, Morgan.

== Head coaching record ==
Year	Team	Overall	Conference	Standing	Bowl/playoffs	Coaches^{#}	AP^{°}
Western Kentucky Hilltoppers (Sun Belt Conference) (2010–2012)
2010	Western Kentucky	2–10	2–6	9th			
2011	Western Kentucky	7–5	7–1	2nd			
2012	Western Kentucky	7–5	4–4	5th	Little Caesars Pizza*		
Western Kentucky:		16–20	13–11	* Departed Western Kentucky for South Florida before bowl game			
South Florida Bulls (American Athletic Conference) (2013–2016)
2013	South Florida	2–10	2–6	8th			
2014	South Florida	4–8	3–5	7th			
2015	South Florida	8–5	6–2	2nd (East)	L Miami Beach		
2016	South Florida	10–2	7–1	T–1st (East)	Birmingham*	19	19
South Florida:		24–25	18–14	* Departed South Florida for Oregon before bowl game			
Oregon Ducks (Pac-12 Conference) (2017)
2017	Oregon	7–5	4–5	4th (North)	Las Vegas*		
Oregon:		7–5	4–5	* Departed Oregon for Florida State before bowl game			
Florida State Seminoles (Atlantic Coast Conference) (2018–2019)
2018	Florida State	5–7	3–5	T–5th (Atlantic)			
2019	Florida State	4–5 (Note: Taggart was fired after the first nine games of the 2019 season. Odell Haggins served as interim head coach for the final four games of the season. Florida State finished the year 6–7 overall and 4–4 in Atlantic Coast Conference play, tying for third place in the Atlantic Division.)	3–4				
Florida State:		9–12	6–9				
Florida Atlantic Owls (Conference USA) (2020–2022)
2020	Florida Atlantic	5–4	4–2	2nd (East)	L Montgomery		
2021	Florida Atlantic	5–7	3–5	T–5th (East)			
2022	Florida Atlantic	5–7	4–4	T–4th			
Florida Atlantic:		15–18	11–11				
Total:		71–80					
National championship Conference title Conference division title or championship game berth
^{#}Rankings from final Coaches Poll.; ^{°}Rankings from final AP Poll.
