= 2016 Charlotte 49ers football team =

American college football season

2016 Charlotte 49ers football
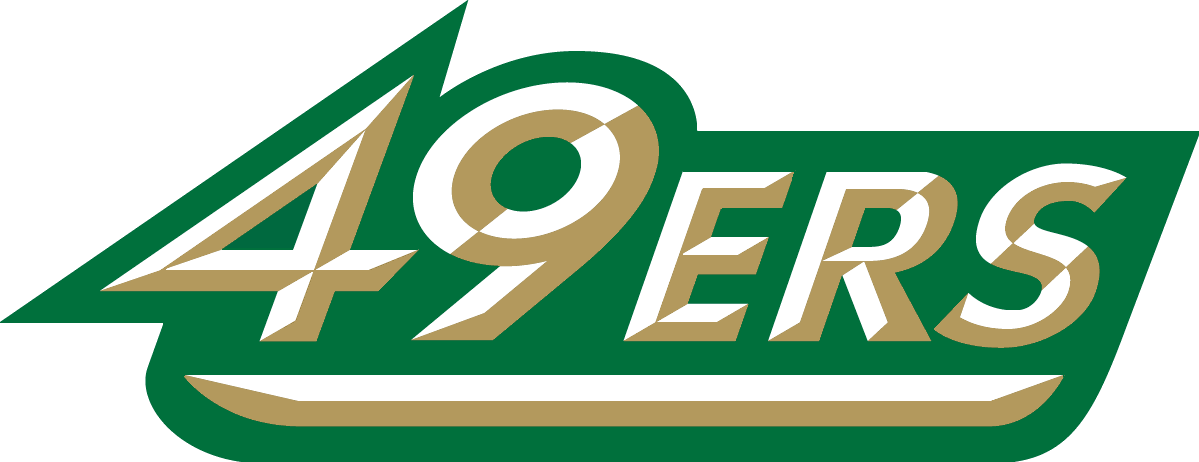
- Conference: Conference USA
- East Division
- Record: 4–8 (3–5 C-USA)
- Head coach: Brad Lambert (4th season)
- Offensive coordinator: Jeff Mullen (4th season)
- Offensive scheme: Spread
- Defensive coordinator: Matt Wallerstedt (2nd season)
- Base defense: 3–4
- Home stadium: Jerry Richardson Stadium

2016 Conference USA football standings
	Conf.			Overall
Team	W		L	W		L
East Division
Western Kentucky xy$	7	–	1	11	–	3
Old Dominion x	7	–	1	10	–	3
Middle Tennessee	5	–	3	8	–	5
FIU	4	–	4	4	–	8
Charlotte	3	–	5	4	–	8
Marshall	2	–	6	3	–	9
Florida Atlantic	2	–	6	3	–	9
West Division
Louisiana Tech xy	6	–	2	9	–	5
UTSA	5	–	3	6	–	7
Southern Miss	4	–	4	7	–	6
North Texas	3	–	5	5	–	8
Rice	2	–	6	3	–	9
UTEP	2	–	6	4	–	8
Championship: Western Kentucky 58, Louisiana Tech 44
$ – Conference champion; x – Division champion/co-champions; y – Championship game participant; Rankings from AP Poll

The 2016 Charlotte 49ers football team represented the University of North Carolina at Charlotte (also called Charlotte or UNC Charlotte) in the 2016 NCAA Division I FBS football season. It was the school's fourth season of NCAA football, their second season of NCAA Division I Football Bowl Subdivision (FBS) play, and their second season as a member of Conference USA's East Division. The team was led by fourth-year head coach Brad Lambert and played its home games on campus at Jerry Richardson Stadium in Charlotte, North Carolina. This was the first season the 49ers were eligible to participate in a bowl game. They finished the season 4–8, 3–5 in C-USA play to finish in fifth place in the East Division.

== Coaching staff ==
Former Eastern Kentucky head coach Dean Hood was announced as assistant head coach and tight ends coach on December 18, 2015. Lambert had worked with Hood at Wake Forest and had been his replacement as defensive coordinator for the Demon Deacons. Johnson Richardson moved from coaching tight ends to offensive line coach. After three years with the 49ers Napoleon Sykes returned to Navy to coach defensive line for the Midshipmen. NC State quality control coach Ulrick Edmonds joined the staff of February 12, 2016. He replaced Sykes as outside linebackers coach. After a one-year stint as offensive line coach, having stepped into the role after the sudden death of Phil Ratliff, former Carolina Panther, Kevin Donnalley returned the Charlotte 49ers radio broadcast team.

Name	Position	Seasons at Charlotte	Alma mater
Brad Lambert	Head coach/Special teams	4	Kansas State (1987)
Dean Hood	Assistant head coach/tight ends	1	Ohio Wesleyan (1985)
Jeff Mullen	Offensive coordinator/quarterbacks	4	Wittenberg (1990)
Matt Wallerstedt	Defensive coordinator/Inside linebackers	2	Kansas State (1988)
James Adams	Secondary	4	Wake Forest (2006)
Aaron Curry	Defensive line	3	Wake Forest (2008)
Ulrick Edmonds	Outside linebackers	1	James Madison (2001)
Damien Gary	Running backs	4	Georgia (2005)
Johnson Richardson	Offensive line	4	Wofford (2010)
Joe Tereshinski III	Wide receivers/Recruiting coordinator	4	Georgia (2006)

== Recruiting ==
=== Recruiting class ===
The following recruits and transfers have signed letters of intent to the Charlotte 49ers football program for the 2016 recruiting year.

College recruiting (2016)
Name	Hometown	School	Height	Weight	40^{‡}	Commit date
Theis Bagnkop; OL	Frederikshavn, Denmark	Louisburg College	6 ft 4 in (1.93 m)	300 lb (140 kg)	–	Feb 3, 2016
Theis Bagnkop; OL	Recruit ratings: Rivals:					
Anthony Butler; LB	Charlotte, NC	Vance H.S.	6 ft 0 in (1.83 m)	181 lb (82 kg)	–	Jun 16, 2015
Anthony Butler; LB	Recruit ratings: Rivals:					
Ryan Carrierre; TE	Loganville, GA	Grayson H.S.	6 ft 4 in (1.93 m)	230 lb (100 kg)	–	Jul 1, 2015
Ryan Carrierre; TE	Recruit ratings: Rivals: 247Sports:					
Ben DeLuca; DB	Orlando, FL	Bishop Moore H.S.	6 ft 0 in (1.83 m)	185 lb (84 kg)	–	Jul 17, 2015
Ben DeLuca; DB	Recruit ratings: Rivals:					
Jacione Fugate; RB	Hampton, VA	Kecoughtan H.S.	5 ft 11 in (1.80 m)	175 lb (79 kg)	4.6	Jan 24, 2016
Jacione Fugate; RB	Recruit ratings: Scout: Rivals:					
Timmy Horne; DT	Wadesboro, NC	Anson H.S.	6 ft 4 in (1.93 m)	270 lb (120 kg)	–	Jun 17, 2015
Timmy Horne; DT	Recruit ratings: Scout: Rivals: 247Sports:					
Benjamin LeMay; RB	Matthews, NC	Butler H.S.	5 ft 9 in (1.75 m)	213 lb (97 kg)	4.56	Feb 26, 2015
Benjamin LeMay; RB	Recruit ratings: Scout: Rivals: 247Sports: ESPN:					
Nick Martin; DL	Lexington, KY	P. L. Dunbar H.S.	6 ft 3 in (1.91 m)	230 lb (100 kg)	–	Feb 3, 2016
Nick Martin; DL	Recruit ratings: Rivals:					
Aaron McAllister; WR	Live Oak, FL	Suwannee H.S.	5 ft 10 in (1.78 m)	200 lb (91 kg)	4.86	Feb 3, 2016
Aaron McAllister; WR	Recruit ratings: Rivals:					
Kevin Olsen; QB	Riverside, CA	Riverside C.C.	6 ft 3 in (1.91 m)	220 lb (100 kg)	4.86	Dec 16, 2015
Kevin Olsen; QB	Recruit ratings: Scout: Rivals: 247Sports:					
Austin Paraison; DT	Lehigh Acres, FL	Lehigh H.S.	6 ft 6 in (1.98 m)	270 lb (120 kg)	–	Jan 24, 2016
Austin Paraison; DT	Recruit ratings: Rivals: 247Sports:					
Johnny Ray; DE	Mount Pleasant, SC	Wando H.S.	6 ft 4 in (1.93 m)	260 lb (120 kg)	4.86	Jun 2, 2015
Johnny Ray; DE	Recruit ratings: Scout: Rivals: 247Sports: ESPN:					
Joe Thompson; QB	Ashburn, VA	Stone Bridge H.S.	6 ft 1 in (1.85 m)	205 lb (93 kg)	4.89	Mar 21, 2015
Joe Thompson; QB	Recruit ratings: Scout: Rivals: 247Sports:					
Robert Washington; RB	Huntersville, NC	East Gaston H.S.	5 ft 10 in (1.78 m)	200 lb (91 kg)	–	Feb 3, 2016
Robert Washington; RB	Recruit ratings: Scout: Rivals: 247Sports: ESPN:					
Jamar Winston; DE	Hutchinson, KS	Hutchinson C.C.	6 ft 8 in (2.03 m)	250 lb (110 kg)	–	Dec 16, 2015
Jamar Winston; DE	Recruit ratings: Rivals: 247Sports:					
Overall recruit ranking: Scout: 118 Rivals: 123 247Sports: 110 ESPN: N/A
‡ Refers to 40-yard dash; Note: In many cases, Scout, Rivals, 247Sports, On3, and ESPN may conflict in their listings of height, weight and 40 time.; In these cases, the average was taken. ESPN grades are on a 100-point scale.; Sources: "Charlotte Football Commitments". Rivals.; "2016 Charlotte Football Commits". Scout.; "ESPN". ESPN.; "Scout.com Team Recruiting Rankings". Scout.; "2016 Team Ranking". Rivals.com.

== Players ==
=== Player gameday honors ===
Wearing Jersey #49	Position	Game	Game Captains	Flag Carriers
Justin Bolus	H-Back	Louisville		
Matt Johnson	Running back	Elon	Kalif Phillips, Thomas La Bianca, Larry Ogunjobi, Kedrick Davis	Robert Washington, Randy Suydam, Anthony Covington
Justin Bridges-Thompson	Linebacker	EMU	Brandon Banks, Austin Duke, Tanner Fleming, Kyle Hoffman	Jeff Gemmell, Ben LeMay, Jack Wellenhofer
Tyriq Harris	Linebacker	Temple	Nick Cook, Austin Duke, T.L. Ford, Larry Ogunjobi	Justin Bridges-Thompson, Arthur Hart, Robert Washington
Nate Davis	Offensive lineman	ODU	Brandon Banks, TL Ford II, Larry Ogunjobi, Kalif Phillips	Cam Clark, Tyriq Harris, Chris Montgomery
Eugene German	Offensive lineman	Florida Atlantic	Brandon Banks, Kyle Hoffman, Larry Ogunjobi, Kalif Phillips	None
Thomas La Bianca	Offensive lineman	FIU	Nick Cook, Eugene German, Hasaan Klugh, Larry Ogunjobi	None
Ben DeLuca	Defensive back	Marshall	Brandon Banks, Austin Duke, Eugene German, Larry Ogunjobi	None
Jarred Barr	Offensive lineman	Southern Miss.	Nick Cook, Jamal Covington, Kyle Hoffman, Larry Ogunjobi	None
Chris Brown	Offensive lineman	Rice	Zach Bumgarner, Nick Cook, Jamal Covington, Terrance Winchester	None
Zach Bumgarner	H-back	Middle Tennessee	Brandon Banks, Larry Ogunjobi, Casey Perry, Kalif Phillips	None
Wolfgang Zacherl	Offensive lineman	UTSA	Nick Cook, Austin Duke, Workpeh Kofa, Daquan Lucas	None

=== Roster ===
2016 Charlotte 49ers football team roster
Players
Coaches
Offense

Pos.	#	Name	Class
QB	2	Kevin Olsen	RJr
RB	3	Kalif Phillips	Sr
QB	5	Lee McNeill	RSr
WR	6	Workpeh Kofa	RSo
WR	7	Mark Quattlebaum	RSo
RB	8	Matt Johnson	RSr
WR	9	Uriah LeMay	RJr
SR	10	Austin Duke	RSr
QB	12	Brooks Barden	RSo
WR	13	T.L. Ford II	Jr
QB	14	Joe Thompson	Fr
H-Back	15	Justin Bolus	RSr
QB	16	Hasaan Klugh	RSo
SR	18	Chris Montgomery	Jr
RB	19	Bradan Smith	Jr
RB	20	Robert Washington	Fr
WR	21	Brooks Cunningham	So
WR	23	Dakota Hopper	RJr
RB	25	Keevin Thompson	So
RB	26	Jacione Fugate	Fr
RB	29	Akease Rankin	RFr
RB	32	Ben Lemay	Fr
H-Back	36	Kyle Hoffman	RSr
G	50	Jarred Barr	RSr
OL	51	Chris Brown	RSo
H-Back	59	Michael Holmes	RFr
OL	60	Darren Drake	So
OL	63	Cameron Curlings	RSr
OL	64	Nate Davis	RSo
OL	68	Jaelin Fisher	Fr
OL	69	Luke Prevette	Fr
OT	70	Casey Perry	RSr
OL	71	Cameron Clark	RFr
OT	73	Jamal Covington	RSr
G	74	Thomas LaBianca	RSr
OT	75	Eugene German	RJr
OL	76	Theis Bagnkop	Fr
OT	77	Wolfgang Zacherl	RJr
OL	78	Trevor Stacy	RFr
OL	79	Josh Snapper	RFr
H-Back	80	Ben Jacques	RFr
WR	81	Trent Bostick	Sr
WR	82	Ben Ellis	Fr
WR	83	Nate Mullen	RFr
WR	84	Juwan Foggie	RSo
H-Back	85	Ryan Carriere	Fr
WR	86	Britton Smith	RFr
H-Back	87	Zach Bumgardner	RSr
H-Back	88	R.J. Tyler	RSo
WR	89	Daniel Rose	RFr
H-Back	90	Zane Tally	RSo

Defense

Pos.	#	Name	Class
DB	2	Kedrick Davis
LB	4	Justin Bridges-Thompson	Sr
DE	5	Brandon Banks	RSr
LB	6	Nick Cook	RSr
DB	9	Nafees Lyon	RFr
DB	11	ED Rolle	Fr
DB	12	Alex Duncan	RSo
LB	17	E.J. Rhinehart	RSr
CB	19	Devin Pearson	RJr
LB	20	Nico Alcalde	RSr
DB	22	J.T. Starr	Fr
DB	23	Anthony Covington	RJr
LB	24	Daquan Lucas	RJr
DB	25	Denzel Irvin	RSo
CB	27	Terrance Winchester	RSr
DB	28	Ben DeLuca	Fr
DB	29	Matt Anthony	RFr
LB	30	Darius Irvin	RFr
DB	31	Markevis Davis	Jr
LB	33	Garrison Duncan	RFr
LB	34	Jeff Gemmell	RFr
LB	35	Tyriq Harris	RFr
LB	35	Nick Vagnone	RSo
DB	36	Robert Cheatem	Fr
DB	37	Keshaun Woods	Fr
DB	38	Arron McAlloster	Fr
DB	39	Tre'Shun Wynn	RSo
DB	40	Jarvis Hutchins	Fr
DB	41	A.J. McDonald	RFr
LB	42	Anthony Butler	Fr
DB	43	Connor Dulmage	RSo
LB	44	Cam Darley	Jr
LB	45	Christian Asher	RSo
LB	46	Alex Highsmith	RFr
LB	47	Carl Yonter	RJr
LB	50	Karrington King	RJr
DL	52	Zach Duncan	RSo
LB	53	Jarett Schott	Fr
LB	54	Jordan Starnes	RJr
LB	55	A.D. Cunningham	RFr
DL	56	Randy Suydam	RFr
DL	57	Austin Paraison	Fr
DL	58	Johnny Ray	Fr
DE	62	Tyler Fain	RSo
NT	65	Larry Ogunjobi	RSr
DL	67	Mitch Monska	RJr
DL	72	Jamar Winston	RJr
DE	90	Tommy Doctor	RFr
DE	91	Nick Carroll	RJr
DL	92	Nick Martin	Fr
LB	93	Javaris Jet	Fr
LB	94	Stedman Lucas	RSo
DL	95	Devin Clegg	RSr
DL	96	Alex Hanff	RFr
LB	96	Josh Stewart	RFr
NT	97	Tanner Flemming	Sr
DL	98	Jon Hardy	RFr
DL	99	Timmy Horne	Fr

Special teams

Pos.	#	Name	Class
P	37	Hayden Pezzoni	RSr
K	38	Jeremy Silinski	Fr
P	39	Kyle Corbett	Fr
P	40	Arthur Hart	Jr
K	43	Jackson VanSickle	Fr
LS	48	Keaston Sinicki	Sr
LS	66	Jack Wellenhofer	Fr
K	69	Stephen Muscarello	RSr
K	86	Blake Brewer	Sr

Head coach

- Brad Lambert (Kansas State)
  Special teams

Coordinators/assistant coaches

- Dean Hood (Ohio Wesleyan)
  Assistant head coach/tight ends
- Jeff Mullen (Wittenberg)
  Offensive coordinator/quarterbacks
- Matt Wallerstedt (Kansas State)
  Defensive coordinator
- James Adams (Wake Forest)
  Secondary
- Aaron Curry (Wake Forest)
  Defensive line
- Ulrick Edmonds (James Madison)
  Outside linebackers
- Damien Gary (Georgia)
  Running backs
- Johnson Richardson (Wofford)
  Offensive line
- Joe Tereshinski III (Georgia)
  Wide receivers

Legend

- (C) Team captain
- (S) Suspended
- (I) Ineligible
- Injured
- Redshirt

Roster
Last update: September 6, 2016

=== Awards and honors ===
==== Preseason ====
Conference usa coaches Awards
Player	Selection	Ref.
Kalif Phillips (SR)	Offense	
Larry Ogunjobi (SR)	Defense	

2016 Watch List Members
Player	Award	Description	Ref.
Jamal Covington (SR)	Allstate Good Works Team	Community Service	
Jamal Covington (SR)	Wuerffel Trophy	Community Servant	
Larry Ogunjobi (SR)	Bednarik Award	Defensive player	
Larry Ogunjobi (SR)	Outland Trophy	Interior Lineman	

==== In Season ====
Conference USA Weekly Awards
Player	Week	Game	Selection	Ref.
Hasaan Klugh (RSO)	6 (Oct. 10)	Florida Atlantic	Co-offensive player of the week	
Terrence Winchester (RSR)	10 (Nov. 7)	Southern Miss.	Defensive player of the week	
Juwan Foggie (RSO)	10 (Nov. 7)	Southern Miss.	Special teams player of the week	

==== Post-season ====
Post Season Honors
Player	Selection	Ref.
Larry Ogunjobi (RSR)	2017 Senior Bowl	
Austin Duke (RSR)	2017 Tropical Bowl	
Austin Duke (RSR)	2017 College Gridiron Showcase	
Ben DeLuca (FR)	Pro Football Focus All-Freshman Team	

Conference USA Post-season Awards
Player	Position	Selection	Ref.
Larry Ogunjobi (RSR)	Nose Tackle	All-Conference Team	
Ben DeLuca (FR)	Defensive back	All-Freshman Team	
Tyriq Harris (RFR)	Linebacker	All-Freshman Team	
Lee McNeill (SRS)	Quarterback	All-Academic Team	

=== Depth chart ===
Defense

FS
A.J. MCDONALD
Markevis Davis
⋅

WLB	ILB	ILB	SLB
DAQUAN LUCAS	NICK COOK	KARRINGTON KING	JORDAN STARNES
Jeff Gemmell	Justin Bridges-Thompson	Garrison Duncan	Tyriq Harris
⋅	⋅	⋅	⋅

SS
ED ROLLE
Alex Duncan
⋅

CB
TERRANCE WINCHESTER
Denzel Irvin
⋅

DE	NT	DE
ZACH DUNCAN	LARRY OGUNJOBI	BRANDON BANKS
Nick Carroll	Tanner Fleming	Randy Suydam
⋅	⋅	⋅

CB
KEDRICK DAVIS
Anthony Covington
⋅

Offense

WR
T.L. FORD II
Juwan Foggie
⋅

WR
AUSTIN DUKE
Chris Montgomery
⋅

LT	LG	C	RG	RT
JAMAL COVINGTON	CASEY PERRY	THOMAS LA BIANCA	NATE DAVIS	CHRIS BROWN
Cameron Clark	Darren Drake	Jarred Barr	Wolfgang Zacherl	Eugene German
⋅	⋅	⋅	⋅	⋅

WR
ZACH BUMGARNER
Kyle Hoffman
⋅

WR
TRENT BOSTICK
Workpeh Kofa
⋅

QB
KEVIN OLSEN
Hasaan Klugh
⋅

RB
KALIF PHILLIPS
Matt Johnson
⋅

Special teams
PK Steve Muscarello
PK Blake Brewer
P Arthur Hart
KR Anthony Covington
PR Austin Duke
LS Keaston Sinicki
H Lee McNeill

== Schedule ==
Date	Time	Opponent	Site	TV	Result	Attendance
September 1	7:00 pm	at No. 19 Louisville*	Papa John's Cardinal Stadium; Louisville, KY	ACCRSN	L 14–70	53,127
September 10	6:00 pm	Elon*	Jerry Richardson Stadium; Charlotte, NC	CUSA.tv	W 47–14	15,807
September 17	6:00 pm	Eastern Michigan*	Jerry Richardson Stadium; Charlotte, NC	CUSA.tv	L 19–37	15,080
September 24	12:00 pm	at Temple*	Lincoln Financial Field; Philadelphia, PA	ASN	L 20–48	27,786
October 1	6:00 pm	Old Dominion	Jerry Richardson Stadium; Charlotte, NC	CUSA.tv	L 17–52	12,589
October 9^{[a]}	12:00 pm	at Florida Atlantic	FAU Stadium; Boca Raton, FL	CUSA.tv	W 28–23	7,401
October 15	6:00 pm	FIU^{†}	Jerry Richardson Stadium; Charlotte, NC	CUSA.tv	L 26–27	13,939
October 22	5:30 pm	at Marshall	Joan C. Edwards Stadium; Huntington, WV	beIN	W 27–24	20,904
November 5	3:30 pm	at Southern Miss	M. M. Roberts Stadium; Hattiesburg, MS	ASN	W 38–27	28,347
November 12	2:00 pm	Rice	Jerry Richardson Stadium; Charlotte, NC	CI	L 21–22	14,306
November 19	2:00 pm	Middle Tennessee	Jerry Richardson Stadium; Charlotte, NC	ESPN3	L 31–38	13,433
November 26	7:00 pm	at UTSA	Alamodome; San Antonio, TX	CI	L 14–33	13,433
*Non-conference game; ^{†}Homecoming; Rankings from AP Poll released prior to game; All times are in Eastern time

^{^[a]}The game between Charlotte and Florida Atlantic scheduled for a 3:30 pm kickoff on October 8, 2016, was postponed due to the effects of Hurricane Matthew. The game was played the following day on October 9, 2016 with a noon kickoff.
Schedule source:

== Television ==
Charlotte 49ers home games and conference road games will be broadcast through Conference USA's television partners ESPN, CBS Sports, ASN, beIN, and Campus Insiders. Additional games will be available online through CUSA.tv.

== Radio ==
Radio coverage for all games is broadcast by IMG College through the Charlotte 49ers Radio Network flagship station WFNZ 610 AM (102.5 FM) The Fan and the TuneIn Charlotte 49ers IMG Sports Network app. The radio announcers are "Voice of the 49ers" Matt Swierad with play-by-play, former Carolina Panther Kevin Donnalley with color commentary, and Bobby Rosinski with sideline reports. Swierad and Donnalley also host the "Gold Mine Live" Coaches Show each Monday during the season at noon from Norm's in the UNC Charlotte Student Union. "Gold Mine Live" can be heard on 1660 AM.

== Preseason media poll ==
Conference USA released their preseason media poll on July 21, 2016, with the 49ers predicted to finish in last place in the East Division.

East Division
Predicted finish	Team
1	Middle Tennessee
2	Western Kentucky
3	Marshall
4	Florida Atlantic
5	FIU
6	Old Dominion
7	Charlotte

== Game summaries ==
=== #19 Louisville Cardinals ===
Charlotte at Louisville

Team	1	2	3	4	Total
49ers	0	0	7	7	14
• #19 Cardinals	28	28	7	7	70

- Date: September 1
- Location: Papa John's Cardinal Stadium
  Louisville, KY
- Game start: 7:04 pm EDT
- Elapsed time: 3:31
- Game attendance: 53,127
- Game weather: 78 °F (26 °C), Partly Cloudy, 14 mph (23 km/h) NNE
- Referee: J. Macongaghy
- TV announcers (RSN): Matt Devlin, James Bates, Jenn Hildreth

Scoring summary
1	12:03	LVILL	Lamar Jackson 36 Yd Run (Evan O'HARA Kick)	LVILL 7–0
1	6:49	LVILL	Reggie Bonnafon 13 Yd pass from Lamar JACKSON (Evan O'HARA Kick)	LVILL 14–0
1	3:47	LVILL	Jeremy SMITH 24 Yd pass from Lamar JACKSON (Evan O'HARA Kick)	LVILL 21–0
1	0:00	LVILL	Lamar JACKSON 1 Yd Run (Evan O'HARA Kick)	LVILL 28–0
2	12:05	LVILL	Brandon RADCLIFF 16 Yd pass from Lamar JACKSON (Evan O'HARA Kick)	LVILL 35–0
2	6:47	LVILL	L.J. SCOTT 20 Yd pass from Lamar JACKSON (Evan O'HARA Kick)	LVILL 42–0
2	2:59	LVILL	James QUICK 32 Yd pass from Lamar JACKSON (Evan O'HARA Kick)	LVILL 49–0
2	0:05	LVILL	Cole Hikutini 1 Yd pass from Lamar JACKSON (Evan O'HARA Kick)	LVILL 56–0
3	8:36	CHAR	Austin DUKE 24 Yd pass from Kevin OLSEN (Stephen MUSCARELLO Kick)	LVILL 56–7
3	4:43	LVILL	Traveon SAMUEL 18 Yd pass from Kyle BOLIN (Evan O'HARA Kick)	LVILL 63–7
4	10:16	LVILL	Seth DAWKINS 13 Yd pass from Kyle BOLIN (Blanton CREQUE Kick)	LVILL 70–7
4	3:46	CHAR	Anthony COVINGTON 0 Yd Fumble Return (Stephen MUSCARELLO Kick)	LVILL 70–14

The 49ers faced their first ACC opponents when they met their former C-USA and Metro Conference foes.

Top performers for the game were Louisville quarterback Lamar Jackson, who passed for 286 yards and 6 touchdowns. Jackson also was the top rusher of the game, with 11 carries for 119 yards and 2 more touchdowns. Charlotte's Austin Duke had 5 receptions for 54 yards and a touchdown.

Game notes:

- First ACC opponent for the 49ers.
- First Nationally ranked FBS opponent.

=== Elon Phoenix ===
Elon at Charlotte

Team	1	2	3	4	Total
Phoenix	7	0	0	7	14
• 49ers	0	20	13	14	47

- Date: September 10
- Location: Jerry Richardson Stadium
  Charlotte, NC
- Game start: 6:05 pm EDT
- Elapsed time: 3:09
- Game attendance: 15,807
- Game weather: 89 °F (32 °C), Clear, 7 mph (11 km/h) N
- Referee: Steven Lamanti
- TV announcers (CUSA.tv): Matt Swierad, Kevin Donnalley, Bobby Rosinski

Scoring summary
1	7:44	ELON	Brandon GENTRY 2 Yd run (John GALLAGHER kick )	ELON 7–0
2	8:39	CHAR	T.L. Ford II 12 Yd pass from Kevin Olsen (Stephen Muscarello Kick)	TIED 7–7
2	4:39	CHAR	Kyle Hoffman 1 Yd pass from Kevin Olsen (Stephen Muscarello PAT failed)	CHAR 13–7
2	0:35	CHAR	Justin Bolus 8 Yd pass from Kevin Olsen (Stephen Muscarello Kick)	CHAR 20–7
3	11:44	CHAR	Robert Washington 1 Yd Run (Two-Point Pass Conversion Failed)	CHAR 26–7
3	5:02	CHAR	Robert Washington 4 Yd Run (Stephen Muscarello Kick)	CHAR 33–7
4	11:14	CHAR	Austin Duke 76 Yd pass from Matt Johnson (Stephen Muscarello Kick)	CHAR 40–7
4	9:36	CHAR	Ben DeLuca 59 Yd Fumble Return (Stephen Muscarello Kick)	CHAR 47–7
4	6:53	ELON	Daniel THOMPSON 6 Yd run (John GALLAGHER kick )	CHAR 47–14

The Phoenix were looking to spoil the 49ers' home opener, but Charlotte got revenge for their first loss of the 2014 season.

Top performers for the game were Charlotte quarterback Kevin Olsen, who passed for 155 yards and 3 touchdowns. Elon rusher Brandon Gentry had 9 carries for 56 yards and a touchdown. Charlotte's Austin Duke had 4 receptions for 103 yards and a touchdown.

Game notes:

=== Eastern Michigan Eagles ===
Eastern Michigan at Charlotte

Team	1	2	3	4	Total
• Eagles	7	10	17	3	37
49ers	0	3	3	13	19

- Date: September 17
- Location: Jerry Richardson Stadium
  Charlotte, NC
- Game start: 6:05 pm EDT
- Elapsed time: 2:54
- Game attendance: 15,080
- Game weather: 85 °F (29 °C), Scattered Clouds, 1 mph (1.6 km/h) N
- Referee: Jay Edwards
- TV announcers (CUSA.tv): Matt Swierad, Kevin Donnalley, Bobby Rosinski

Scoring summary
1	4:11	EMU	Ian ERIKSEN 5 Yd run (Paul FRICANO Kick)	EMU 7–0
2	11:34	CHAR	Stephen MUSCARELLO 29 Yd field goal	EMU 7–3
2	5:36	EMU	Paul FRICANO 22 Yd field goal	EMU 10–3
2	1:10	EMU	Nigel KILBY 5 Yd pass from Todd PORTER (Paul FRICANO Kick)	EMU 17–3
3	11:36	EMU	Johnny NIUPALAU 49 Yd pass from Todd PORTER (Paul FRICANO Kick)	EMU 24–3
3	9:28	CHAR	Stephen MUSCARELLO 25 Yd field goal	EMU 24–6
3	4:20	EMU	Paul FRICANO 36 Yd field goal	EMU 27–6
3	3:51	EMU	Jaylen PICKETT 36 Yd interception return (Paul FRICANO Kick)	EMU 34–6
4	14:17	CHAR	Workpeh KOFA 10 Yd pass from Hasaan KLUGH (Stephen MUSCARELLO Kick)	EMU 34–13
4	9:42	CHAR	T.L. FORD II 28 Yd pass from Hasaan KLUGH (Stephen MUSCARELLO Kick failed)	EMU 34–19
4	3:18	EMU	Paul FRICANO 30 Yd field goal	EMU 37–19

The 49ers hosted their first opponents from the MAC when the Eagles visited Charlotte for the first time.

Top performers for the game were Eastern Michigan quarterback Todd Porter, who passed for 285 yards, 2 touchdowns, and 1 interception. Charlotte rusher Robert Washington had 20 carries for 120 yards. Eastern Michigan's Johnny Niupalau had 3 receptions for 72 yards and a touchdown.

Game notes:

- First MAC opponent for the 49ers.

=== Temple Owls ===
Charlotte at Temple

Team	1	2	3	4	Total
49ers	7	0	7	6	20
• Owls	3	28	14	3	48

- Date: September 24
- Location: Lincoln Financial Field
  Philadelphia, PA
- Game start: 12:06 pm EDT
- Elapsed time: 3:13
- Game attendance: 27,786
- Game weather: 63 °F (17 °C), Cloudy, 9 mph (14 km/h) NE
- Referee: Chas Lamertina
- TV announcers (ASN): Michael Gleason, Mike Dunek, Kevin Copp

Scoring summary
1	9:58	TEMP	Austin JONES 36 Yd field goal	TEMP 3–0
1	0:42	CHAR	Workpeh KOFA 8 Yd pass from Kevin OLSEN (Stephen MUSCARELLO Kick)	CHAR 7–3
2	14:52	TEMP	Adonis JENNINGS 51 Yd pass from Phillip Walker (Austin JONES Kick)	TEMP 10–7
2	6:53	TEMP	Jahad THOMAS 13 Yd run (Austin JONES Kick)	TEMP 17–7
2	4:26	TEMP	Brodrick YANCY 40 Yd pass from Phillip WALKER (Austin JONES Kick)	TEMP 24–7
2	0:40	TEMP	Ryquell Armstead 1 Yd run (Austin JONES Kick)	TEMP 31–7
3	13:34	CHAR	Kalif PHILLIPS 66 Yd run (Stephen MUSCARELLO Kick)	TEMP 31–14
3	8:37	TEMP	Jahad THOMAS 1 Yd run (Austin JONES Kick)	TEMP 38–14
3	5:14	TEMP	Ryquell ARMSTEAD 1 Yd run (Austin JONES Kick)	TEMP 45–14
4	12:52	TEMP	Austin JONES 31 Yd field goal	TEMP 48–14
4	8:34	CHAR	Robert WASHINGTON 4 Yd run (Stephen MUSCARELLO Kick failed)	TEMP 48–20

Charlotte visited the "City of Brotherly Love" for the first time hoping to return the favor to their former A10 conference mates for the drubbing they received at the hands of the Owls the previous season. Unfortunately it was more of the same for the 49ers.

Top performers for the game were Temple quarterback Phillip Walker, who passed for 268 yards and 2 touchdowns. Temple rusher Jahad Thomas had 15 carries for 68 yards and 2 touchdowns. Temple's Brodrick Yancey had 4 receptions for 70 yards and a touchdown.

Game notes:

- First game for the 49ers in the State of Pennsylvania.

=== Old Dominion Monarchs ===
Old Dominion at Charlotte

Team	1	2	3	4	Total
• Monarchs	21	10	21	0	52
49ers	3	7	0	7	17

- Date: October 1
- Location: Jerry Richardson Stadium
  Charlotte, NC
- Game start: 6:05 pm EDT
- Elapsed time: 3:17
- Game attendance: 12,589
- Game weather: 77 °F (25 °C), Clear, 0 mph (0 km/h)
- Referee: Joe Pester
- TV announcers (CUSA.tv): Matt Swierad, Kevin Donnalley, Bobby Rosinski

Scoring summary
1	9:57	ODU	Jeremy COX 1 Yd Run (Brad DAVIS Kick)	ODU 7–0
1	6:54	ODU	Jeremy COX 1 Yd Run (Brad DAVIS Kick)	ODU 14–0
1	2:12	CHAR	Stephen MUSCARELLO 23 Yd Field Goal	ODU 14–3
1	0:30	ODU	Zach PASCAL 25 Yd pass from David WASHINGTON (Brad DAVIS Kick)	ODU 21–3
2	12:29	ODU	Travis FULGHAM 55 Yd pass from David WASHINGTON (Brad DAVIS Kick)	ODU 28–3
2	4:56	ODU	Brad DAVIS 35 Yd Field Goal	ODU 31–3
2	0:02	CHAR	Kalif PHILLIPS 42 Yd pass from Kevin OLSEN (Stephen MUSCARELLO Kick)	ODU 31–10
3	10:24	ODU	Jeremy COX 1 Yd Run (Brad DAVIS Kick)	ODU 38–10
3	4:15	ODU	Isaiah HARPER 9 Yd pass from David WASHINGTON (Brad DAVIS Kick)	ODU 45–10
3	0:15	ODU	Gemonta JACKSON 37 Yd Run (Brad DAVIS Kick)	ODU 52–10
4	2:57	CHAR	Hasaan KLUGH 3 Yd Run (Stephen MUSCARELLO Kick)	ODU 52–17

The 49ers were looking to even the series up when the Monarchs visited Charlotte for the first time. Unfortunately the Niners would fall hard to a fired-up Monarchs squad for the first C-USA game of the season.

Top performers for the game were Old Dominion quarterback David Washington, who passed for 256 yards, 3 touchdowns, and 1 interception. ODU rusher Gemonta Jackson had 9 carries for 55 yards and a touchdown. ODU's Zach Pascal had 5 receptions for 68 yards and a touchdown.

Game notes:

=== Florida Atlantic Owls ===
Charlotte at Florida Atlantic

Team	1	2	3	4	Total
• 49ers	7	14	7	0	28
Owls	3	14	0	6	23

- Date: October 9
- Location: FAU Stadium
  Boca Raton, FL
- Game start: 12:05 pm EDT
- Elapsed time: 3:11
- Game attendance: 7,401
- Game weather: 80 °F (27 °C), Partly Cloudy, 9 mph (14 km/h) NNW
- Referee: Ken Antee
- TV announcers (CUSA.tv): Ken LaVicka, Kris Bartels, Mike Mreczko, Brian Rowitz

Scoring summary
1	11:09	FAU	Greg Joseph 33 Yd Field Goal	FAU 3–0
1	04:17	CHAR	Hasaan KLUGH 2 Yd Run (Stephen MUSCARELLO Kick)	CHAR 7–3
2	14:54	FAU	Gregory HOWELL Jr. 3 Yd Run (Greg JOSEPH Kick)	FAU 10–7
2	10:51	CHAR	Austin DUKE 69 Yd pass from Hasaan KLUGH (Stephen MUSCARELLO Kick)	CHAR 14–10
2	01:53	FAU	Gregory HOWELL Jr. 3 Yd Run (Greg JOSEPH Kick)	FAU 17–14
2	00:23	CHAR	T.L. FORD II 37 Yd pass from Hasaan KLUGH (Stephen MUSCARELLO Kick)	CHAR 21–17
3	10:12	CHAR	Justin BOLUS 3 Yd pass from Hasaan KLUGH (Stephen MUSCARELLO Kick)	CHAR 28–17
4	09:28	FAU	Gregory HOWELL Jr. 3 Yd Run (Two-Point Pass Conversion Failed)	CHAR 28–23

Charlotte visited Boca Raton for the first time looking to avenge a fourth quarter loss at home from the previous season. Not only did they accomplish that, but they also got their first conference win in program history after a controversial call reversal on a no time left Hail Mary ruled touchdown pass by FAU.

Top performers for the game were Charlotte quarterback Hasaan Klugh, who passed for 223 yards, 3 touchdowns, and 1 interception. FAU rusher Gregory Howell Jr. had 20 carries for 100 yards and 3 touchdowns. Charlotte's Austin Duke had 6 receptions for 111 yards and a touchdown.

Game notes:

- First Conference USA win in program history.
- Game delayed one day due to local effects of Hurricane Mathew.
- First Sunday game in program history.
- Austin Duke reached the 3000 yard career reception mark.
- Hasaan Klugh was named C-USA Co-offensive Player of the Week.

=== FIU Panthers ===
FIU at Charlotte

Team	1	2	3	4	Total
• Panthers	7	3	3	14	27
49ers	0	10	7	9	26

- Date: October 15
- Location: Jerry Richardson Stadium
  Charlotte, NC
- Game start: 6:05 pm EDT
- Elapsed time: 3:00
- Game attendance: 13,939
- Game weather: 70 °F (21 °C), Scattered Clouds, 1 mph (1.6 km/h) N
- Referee: Daniel Gautreau
- TV announcers (CUSA.tv): Matt Swierad, Kevin Donnalley, Bobby Rosinski

Scoring summary
1	4:18	FIU	Alex McGough 19 Yd Run (Austin TAYLOR Kick)	FIU 7–0
2	14:10	CHAR	Workpeh KOFA 12 Yd pass from Hasaan KLUGH (Stephen MUSCARELLO Kick)	TIED 7–7
2	6:45	FIU	Austin TAYLOR 21 Yd Field Goal	FIU 10–7
2	1:04	CHAR	Stephen MUSCARELLO 29 Yd Field Goal	TIED 10–10
3	8:57	CHAR	Hasaan KLUGH 12 Yd Run (Stephen MUSCARELLO Kick)	CHAR 17–10
3	2:32	FIU	Austin TAYLOR 23 Yd Field Goal	CHAR 17–13
4	13:05	CHAR	Robert WASHINGTON 3 Yd Run (Stephen MUSCARELLO PAT blocked)	CHAR 23–13
4	7:12	CHAR	Stephen MUSCARELLO 32 Yd Field Goal	CHAR 26–13
4	4:21	FIU	A.J. BRANISEL 15 Yd pass from Alex MCGOUGH (Austin TAYLOR Kick)	CHAR 26–20
4	1:05	FIU	Jonnu Smith 9 Yd pass from Alex MCGOUGH (Austin TAYLOR Kick)	FIU 27–26

Charlotte was looking to even the series when the Panthers visited the Queen City for the first time. But a late score by FIU and a missed long range field goal would result in Charlotte's fourth lost Homecoming Game in a row.

Top performers for the game were FAU quarterback Alex McGough, who passed for 315 yards, 2 touchdowns, and 2 interceptions. Charlotte rusher Kalif Phillips had 24 carries for 99 yards. FAU's Thomas Owens had 11 receptions for 148 yards.

Game notes:

- Larry Ogunjobi, the 49ers' all-Conference USA nose tackle had 4.5 tackles for a loss, including 1.5 sacks, and a team-best 10 tackles.

=== Marshall Thundering Herd ===
Charlotte at Marshall

Team	1	2	3	4	Total
• 49ers	10	7	3	7	27
Thundering Herd	14	10	0	0	24

- Date: October 22
- Location: Joan C. Edwards Stadium
  Huntington, WV
- Game start: 5:35 pm EDT
- Elapsed time: 3:33
- Game attendance: 20,904
- Game weather: 53 °F (12 °C), Mostly Sunny, 8 mph (13 km/h) NW
- Referee: Tra Blake
- TV announcers (beIN): Matt Martucci, Brett Romberg, Jordan Daigle

Scoring summary
1	11:05	CHAR	Kalif PHILLIPS 1 Yd Run (Stephen MUSCARELLO Kick)	CHAR 7–0
1	6:31	MARSH	Keion DAVIS 2 Yd Run (Amoreto CURRAJ Kick)	TIED 7–7
1	4:50	MARSH	Justin HUNT 4 Yd pass from Chase Litton (Amoreto CURRAJ Kick)	MARSH 14–7
1	1:10	CHAR	Blake BREWER 38 Yd Field Goal	MARSH 14–10
2	11:24	MARSH	Justin HUNT 5 Yd pass from Chase LITTON (Amoreto CURRAJ Kick)	MARSH 21–10
2	8:48	CHAR	Kalif PHILLIPS 5 Yd Run (Blake BREWER Kick)	MARSH 21–17
2	7:22	MARSH	Amoreto CURRAJ 38 Yd Field Goal	MARSH 24–17
3	6:26	CHAR	Blake BREWER 25 Yd Field Goal	MARSH 24–20
4	8:32	CHAR	Hasaan KLUGH 2 Yd Run (Blake BREWER Kick)	CHAR 27–24

Charlotte visited the State of West Virginia for the first time looking to avenge a loss at home from the previous season. Task accomplished, the 49ers even the series with Marshall and notched their second C-USA road win of the season.

Top performers for the game were Marshall quarterback Chase Litton, who passed for 262 yards, 2 touchdowns, and 1 interception. Charlotte rusher Kalif Phillips had 23 carries for 123 yards and 2 touchdowns. Marshall's Josh Knight had 10 receptions for 94 yards.

Game notes:

- First game in the State of West Virginia.
- Kalif Phillips, the 49ers' running back ran for 123 yards, his fourth 100-yard-plus performance this season.

=== Southern Miss Golden Eagles ===
Charlotte at Southern Miss

Team	1	2	3	4	Total
• 49ers	7	21	10	0	38
Golden Eagles	14	0	0	13	27

- Date: November 5
- Location: M. M. Roberts Stadium
  Hattiesburg, MS
- Game start: 2:36 pm CDT
- Elapsed time: 3:21
- Game attendance: 28,347
- Game weather: 77 °F (25 °C), Clear, 3 mph (4.8 km/h)
- Referee: Jay Edwards
- TV announcers (ASN): Ron Thulin, Keith Moreland

Scoring summary
1	10:13	CHAR	Hasaan KLUGH 7 Yd Run (Blake BREWER Kick)	CHAR 7–0
1	5:45	USM	Korey Robertson 3 Yd pass from Nick Mullens (Parker SHAUNFIELD Kick)	TIED 7–7
1	0:35	USM	Chase WHITEHEAD 78 Yd pass from Nick MULLENS (Parker SHAUNFIELD Kick)	USM 14–7
2	13:29	CHAR	Robert WASHINGTON 58 Yd Run (Blake BREWER Kick)	TIED 14–14
2	1:46	CHAR	Chris MONTGOMERY 9 Yd Run (Blake BREWER Kick)	CHAR 21–14
2	0:35	CHAR	T.L. FORD II 18 Yd pass from Hasaan KLUGH (Blake BREWER Kick)	CHAR 28–14
3	9:29	CHAR	Blake BREWER 22 Yd Field Goal	CHAR 31–14
3	3:18	CHAR	Ed ROLLE 0 Yd Return of Blocked Punt (Blake BREWER Kick)	CHAR 38–14
4	14:11	USM	Ito Smith 8 Yd Run (Two-Point Pass Conversion Failed)	CHAR 38–20
4	4:56	USM	Parker ADAMSON 2 Yd Run (Parker SHAUNFIELD Kick)	CHAR 38–27

Charlotte visited the State of Mississippi for the first time looking to avenge a loss at home from the previous season. Charlotte dominated the game, becoming the first time in C-USA history to win on the road at Marshall and Southern Miss. in a single season.

Top performers for the game were Southern Miss. quarterback Nate Mullens, who passed for 249 yards, 2 touchdowns, and 2 interceptions. Charlotte rusher Kalif Phillips had 29 carries for 183 yards. Southern Miss's Chase Whitehead had 2 receptions for 84 yards and a touchdown.

Game notes:

- First game in the State of Mississippi.
- Coming off a 4-week injury, Terrence Winchester was named C-USA Defensive Player of the Week.
- Juwan Foggie was named C-USA Special Teams Player of the Week.
- First time Charlotte has won back-to-back FBS and conference games.

=== Rice Owls ===
Rice at Charlotte

Team	1	2	3	4	Total
• Owls	0	10	6	6	22
49ers	7	14	0	0	21

- Date: November 12
- Location: Jerry Richardson Stadium
  Charlotte, NC
- Game start: 2:05 pm EST
- Elapsed time: 3:05
- Game attendance: 14,306
- Game weather: 57 °F (14 °C), Clear, 11 mph (18 km/h) NE
- Referee: Joe Pester
- TV announcers (Campus Insiders): Jeff Fischel, Darius Walker

Scoring summary
1	6:57	CHAR	Kalif PHILLIPS 14 Yd Run (Blake BREWER Kick)	CHAR 7–0
2	13:19	CHAR	Workpeh KOFA 4 Yd pass from Hasaan KLUGH (Blake BREWER Kick)	CHAR 14–0
2	8:47	CHAR	Terrance WINCHESTER 41 Yd Interception Return (Blake BREWER Kick)	CHAR 21–0
2	4:58	RICE	Hayden TOBOLA 24 Yd Field Goal	CHAR 21–3
2	0:52	RICE	Temi ALAKA 3 Yd pass from Tyler STEHLING (Hayden TOBOLA Kick)	CHAR 21–10
3	4:26	RICE	Tyler STEHLING 17 Yd Run (Two-Point Pass Conversion Failed)	CHAR 21–16
4	2:53	RICE	Tyler STEHLING 1 Yd Run (Two-Point Pass Conversion Failed)	RICE 22–21

Charlotte pulled ahead for a three touchdown lead, but an anemic second half let Rice win the game off of quarterback Tyler Stehling's arms and legs.

Top performers for the game were Rice Stehling, who passed for 279 yards, a touchdown, and an interception. Stehling was also the top rusher of the game, with 20 carries for 93 yards and two touchdowns. Rice's Zach Wright had 12 receptions for 111 yards.

Game notes:

- Charlotte's second 1-point loss of the season.

=== Middle Tennessee Blue Raiders ===
Middle Tennessee at Charlotte

Team	1	2	3	4	Total
• Blue Raiders	14	10	7	7	38
49ers	0	6	10	15	31

- Date: November 19
- Location: Jerry Richardson Stadium
  Charlotte, NC
- Game start: 2:04 pm EST
- Elapsed time: 3:36
- Game attendance: 13,433
- Game weather: 71 °F (22 °C), Scattered Clouds , 12 mph (19 km/h) W
- Referee: Jay Edwards
- TV announcers (ESPN 3): Bobby Rosinski, Damione Lewis

Scoring summary
1	11:20	MTSU	Ty LEE 5 Yd pass from John URZUA (Canon ROOKER Kick)	MTSU 7–0
1	6:32	MTSU	Richie James 7 Yd pass from John URZUA (Canon ROOKER Kick)	MTSU 14–0
2	13:12	CHAR	Hasaan KLUGH 16 Yd Run (Blake BREWER PAT failed)	MTSU 14–6
2	8:39	MTSU	Patrick SMITH 6 Yd pass from John URZUA (Canon ROOKER Kick)	MTSU 21–6
2	0:18	MTSU	Canon ROOKER 41 Yd Field Goal	MTSU 24–6
3	11:15	CHAR	Hasaan KLUGH 4 Yd Run (Blake BREWER Kick)	MTSU 24–13
3	4:12	MTSU	Patrick SMITH 14 Yd pass from John URZUA (Canon ROOKER Kick)	MTSU 31–13
3	0:19	CHAR	Blake BREWER 38 Yd Field Goal	MTSU 31–16
4	8:18	CHAR	Hasaan KLUGH 2 Yd Run (Blake BREWER Kick)	MTSU 31–23
4	4:53	CHAR	Workpeh KOFA 8 Yd pass from Hasaan KLUGH (Austin DUKE Pass to Hasaan KLUGH for Two-Point Conversion)	TIED 31–31
4	1:12	MTSU	Ty LEE 61 Yd Run (Canon ROOKER Kick)	MTSU 38–31

In Charlotte's first ever C-USA game the hosting Blue Raiders set new program records by pounding out a 42 to 7 first quarter on the thunderstruck 49ers. Charlotte was looking to return the favor when the Blue Raiders visited Charlotte for the first time. After a valiant late push to tie the game up late in the fourth quarter, Middle Tennessee would get the go ahead score and end the 49ers' chances of bowl eligibility.

Top performers for the game were Middle Tennessee quarterback John Urzua, who passed for 250 yards, 4 touchdowns, and 2 interceptions. Middle Tennessee rusher I'Tavius Mathers had 16 carries for 101 yards. Middle Tennessee's Richie James had 8 receptions for 89 yards and a touchdown.

Game notes:

- Twenty-seven 49ers would participate in their final home collegiate game, including nineteen from Charlotte's very first recruiting class: Brandon Banks, Jarred Barr, Justin Bolus, Trent Bostick, Blake Brewer, Justin Bridges-Thompson, Zach Bumgardner, Devin Clegg, Nick Cook, Cameron Curlings, Jamal Covington, Kendrick Davis, Austin Duke, Tanner Fleming, Kyle Hoffman, Matt Johnson, Thomas La Bianca, Daquan Lucas, Lee McNeill, Stephen Muscarello, Cassy Perry, Hayden Pezzoni, Kalif Phillips, Larry Ogunjobi, E.J. Rhinehart, Keaston Sinicki, Bradan Smith, Terrance Winchester.

=== UTSA Roadrunners ===
Charlotte at UTSA

Team	1	2	3	4	Total
49ers	7	0	0	7	14
• Roadrunners	10	7	3	13	33

- Date: November 26
- Location: Alamodome
  San Antonio, TX
- Game start: 6:06 pm CST
- Game attendance: 23,807
- Game weather: Indoor Stadium
- Referee: Steve LaMantia
- TV announcers (Campus Insiders): Ray Crawford, Max Starks

Scoring summary
1	13:36	UTSA	Kerry THOMAS Jr. 73 Yd pass from Dalton STURM (Victor Falcon Kick)	UTSA 7–0
1	12:58	CHAR	Austin DUKE 76 Yd pass from Hasaan KLUGH (Blake BREWER Kick)	TIED 7–7
1	3:20	UTSA	Victor FALCON 21 Yd Field Goal	UTSA 10–7
2	3:08	UTSA	Brady JONES 13 Yd pass from Dalton STURM (Victor FALCON Kick)	UTSA 17–7
3	4:41	UTSA	Victor FALCON 26 Yd Field Goal	UTSA 20–7
4	14:54	CHAR	Juwan FOGGIE 3 Yd Fumble Return (Blake BREWER Kick)	UTSA 20–14
4	8:19	UTSA	Marquez MCNAIR 20 Yd pass from Jared JOHNSON (Two-Point Pass Conversion Failed)	UTSA 26–14
4	4:29	UTSA	Jalen RHODES 2 Yd Run (Victor FALCON Kick)	UTSA 33–14

The final home game of the 2015 season for Charlotte went down to the wire with the Roadrunners pulling out an overtime victory. Charlotte was looking to return the favor as they visited San Antonio for the first time. The game was controlled by the Roadrunners until Charlotte got within a touchdown score; but the Roadrunners would pull away late to clinch their spot in a bowl game, and end the 49ers' season with a loss.

Top performers for the game were UT San Antonio quarterback Dalton Strum, who passed for 146 yards and a touchdown. UT San Antonio rusher Jarveon Williams had 19 carries for 48 yards. UTSA's Kerry Thomas Jr. had 5 receptions for 145 yards and a touchdown.

Game notes:

- Matt Johnson would finish his collegiate career with 5,405 passing yards to become to the 49ers' all-time leading passer, with an additional 1,273 rushing yards to his credit.
- Kalif Phillips would finish his collegiate career with 4,020 rushing yards, and 41 rushing touchdowns (43 overall) becoming the 49ers' all-time rushing leader and scorer.
- Austin Duke would finish his collegiate career with his 4th 100 yard game of the season and his 13th 100 yard game overall.
- Duke would also finish his collegiate career with 3,437 receiving yards, becoming the 49ers' career leader in receptions and 24 receiving touchdowns (25 overall). He is the 49ers' #2 all-time leading scorer behind Phillips.
- Larry Ogunjobi would finish his collegiate career with 49 tackles for losses, 13 sacks, and 217 tackles to become the 49ers' all-time leader in each category. He also started all 46 games in program history.
- Ogunjobi was selected to participate in the 2017 Senior Bowl.

== Attendance ==
Season	Games	Sellouts	W–L (%)	Attendance	Average	Best
2016	6	1	1–5 (.167)	85,154	14,192	15,807

== Players drafted into the NFL ==
Round	Pick	Player	Position	NFL club
3	65	Larry Ogunjobi	DT	Cleveland Browns
