= 2016 UTSA Roadrunners football team =

American college football season

2016 UTSA Roadrunners football

New Mexico Bowl, L 20–23 vs. New Mexico
- Conference: Conference USA
- West Division
- Record: 6–7 (5–3 C-USA)
- Head coach: Frank Wilson (1st season)
- Offensive coordinator: Frank Scelfo (1st season)
- Offensive scheme: Multiple
- Defensive coordinator: Pete Golding (1st season)
- Base defense: 4–2–5
- Home stadium: Alamodome

2016 Conference USA football standings
	Conf.			Overall
Team	W		L	W		L
East Division
Western Kentucky xy$	7	–	1	11	–	3
Old Dominion x	7	–	1	10	–	3
Middle Tennessee	5	–	3	8	–	5
FIU	4	–	4	4	–	8
Charlotte	3	–	5	4	–	8
Marshall	2	–	6	3	–	9
Florida Atlantic	2	–	6	3	–	9
West Division
Louisiana Tech xy	6	–	2	9	–	5
UTSA	5	–	3	6	–	7
Southern Miss	4	–	4	7	–	6
North Texas	3	–	5	5	–	8
Rice	2	–	6	3	–	9
UTEP	2	–	6	4	–	8
Championship: Western Kentucky 58, Louisiana Tech 44
$ – Conference champion; x – Division champion/co-champions; y – Championship game participant; Rankings from AP Poll

The 2016 UTSA Roadrunners football team represented the University of Texas at San Antonio in the 2016 NCAA Division I FBS football season. The Roadrunners played their home games at the Alamodome in San Antonio, Texas and competed in the West Division of Conference USA (C–USA). They were led by first-year head coach Frank Wilson. They finished the season 6–7, 5–3 in C-USA play to finish in second place in the West Division. They were invited to the New Mexico Bowl, the school's first ever bowl game, where they were defeated by New Mexico.

== Schedule ==
UTSA announced its 2016 football schedule on February 4, 2016. The 2016 schedule consists of 6 home and away games in the regular season. The Roadrunners will host C–USA foes Charlotte, North Texas, Southern Miss, and UTEP, and will travel to Louisiana Tech, Middle Tennessee, Old Dominion, and Rice.

The team will play four non–conference games, two home games against Alabama State from the Southwestern Athletic Conference (SWAC) and Arizona State from the Pac-12 Conference, and two road games which are against the Colorado State Rams from the Mountain West Conference and the Texas A&M Aggies from the Southeastern Conference (SEC).

Date	Time	Opponent	Site	TV	Result	Attendance
September 3	6:00 p.m.	Alabama State*	Alamodome; San Antonio, TX	KMYS	W 26–13	22,380
September 10	3:00 p.m.	at Colorado State*	Hughes Stadium; Fort Collins, CO	CI/Twitter	L 14–23	20,673
September 16	8:30 p.m.	Arizona State*	Alamodome; San Antonio, TX	ESPN2	L 28–32	29,035
September 24	2:30 p.m.	at Old Dominion	Foreman Field; Norfolk, VA	KMYS	L 19–33	20,118
October 8	11:00 a.m.	Southern Miss	Alamodome; San Antonio, TX	ASN	W 55–32	19,818
October 15	6:00 p.m.	at Rice	Rice Stadium; Houston, TX	beIN	W 14–13	20,134
October 22	6:00 p.m.	UTEP^{†}	Alamodome; San Antonio, TX	KMYS	L 49–52 ^{5OT}	23,633
October 29	6:00 p.m.	North Texas	Alamodome; San Antonio, TX	KMYS	W 31–17	19,553
November 5	1:30 p.m.	at Middle Tennessee	Johnny "Red" Floyd Stadium; Murfreesboro, TN	ESPN3	W 45–25	13,505
November 12	2:30 p.m.	at Louisiana Tech	Joe Aillet Stadium; Ruston, LA	KMYS	L 35–63	23,012
November 19	11:00 a.m.	at No. 23 Texas A&M*	Kyle Field; College Station, TX	ESPNU	L 10–23	102,502
November 26	6:00 p.m.	Charlotte	Alamodome; San Antonio, TX	CI	W 33–14	23,807
December 17	1:00 p.m.	at New Mexico*	University Stadium; Albuquerque, NM (New Mexico Bowl)	ESPN	L 20–23	29,688
*Non-conference game; ^{†}Homecoming; Rankings from AP Poll released prior to the game; All times are in Central time

== Game summaries ==
=== Alabama State ===
	1	2	3	4	Total
Hornets	7	0	0	6	13
Roadrunners	6	8	6	6	26

=== At Colorado State ===
	1	2	3	4	Total
Roadrunners	7	7	0	0	14
Rams	10	10	0	3	23

=== Arizona State ===
	1	2	3	4	Total
Sun Devils	3	9	3	17	32
Roadrunners	14	0	14	0	28

=== At Old Dominion ===
	1	2	3	4	Total
Roadrunners	0	7	12	0	19
Monarchs	6	7	12	8	33

=== Southern Miss ===
	1	2	3	4	Total
Golden Eagles	7	14	3	8	32
Roadrunners	28	10	7	10	55

=== At Rice ===
	1	2	3	4	Total
Roadrunners	7	7	0	0	14
Owls	6	0	7	0	13

=== UTEP ===
	1	2	3	4	OT	2OT	3OT	4OT	5OT	Total
Miners	7	7	14	0	3	7	8	0	6	52
Roadrunners	14	7	7	0	3	7	8	0	3	49

=== North Texas ===
	1	2	3	4	Total
Mean Green	0	0	07	10	17
Roadrunners	7	7	10	7	31

=== At Middle Tennessee ===
	1	2	3	4	Total
Roadrunners	14	14	14	3	45
Blue Raiders	7	3	7	8	25

=== At Louisiana Tech ===
	1	2	3	4	Total
Roadrunners	7	7	0	21	35
Bulldogs	14	21	7	21	63

=== At Texas A&M ===
	1	2	3	4	Total
Roadrunners	0	7	3	0	10
#23 Aggies	10	6	7	0	23

=== Charlotte ===
	1	2	3	4	Total
49ers	7	0	0	7	14
Roadrunners	10	7	3	13	33

=== At New Mexico–New Mexico Bowl ===
	1	2	3	4	Total
Roadrunners	3	3	0	14	20
Lobos	7	3	6	7	23

== Personnel ==
=== Coaching staff ===
Name	Position	Alma mater
Frank Wilson	Head Coach	Nicholls State
Jason Rollins	Associate head coach/linebackers coach	McNeese State
Ricky Brumfield	Special Teams coordinator/tight ends coach	Utah State
Pete Golding	Defensive coordinator/Cornerbacks coach	Delta State
Eric Henderson	Defensive Line Coach	Georgia Tech
Jeff Kastl	Receivers coach	Michigan
Ryan Pugh	Offensive Line Coach	Auburn
Everette Sands	Running Backs coach	The Citadel
Frank Scelfo	Offensive coordinator/quarterbacks coach	Louisiana-Monroe
Patrick Toney	Safeties coach	Southeastern Louisiana
Giovanni Vizza	Graduate Assistant Coach (Offense)	Texas A&M
Ryan Filo	Head Football Strength and Conditioning Coach	Wisconsin-La Cross
Spencer Ross	Assistant Football Strength & Conditioning Coach	Southern
Tony Jeffery	Assistant Athletics Director/Football	Texas
Jacob LaFrance	Director of player personnel	Louisiana State
