= 2016 FIU Panthers football team =

American college football season

2016 FIU Panthers football
- Conference: Conference USA
- East Division
- Record: 4–8 (4–4 C-USA)
- Head coach: Ron Turner (4th season; first 4 games); Ron Cooper (interim; remainder of season)
- Offensive coordinator: Steve Shankweiler (3rd season)
- Offensive scheme: Pro set
- Defensive coordinator: Ron Cooper (1st season)
- Base defense: 4–3
- Home stadium: FIU Stadium

2016 Conference USA football standings
	Conf.			Overall
Team	W		L	W		L
East Division
Western Kentucky xy$	7	–	1	11	–	3
Old Dominion x	7	–	1	10	–	3
Middle Tennessee	5	–	3	8	–	5
FIU	4	–	4	4	–	8
Charlotte	3	–	5	4	–	8
Marshall	2	–	6	3	–	9
Florida Atlantic	2	–	6	3	–	9
West Division
Louisiana Tech xy	6	–	2	9	–	5
UTSA	5	–	3	6	–	7
Southern Miss	4	–	4	7	–	6
North Texas	3	–	5	5	–	8
Rice	2	–	6	3	–	9
UTEP	2	–	6	4	–	8
Championship: Western Kentucky 58, Louisiana Tech 44
$ – Conference champion; x – Division champion/co-champions; y – Championship game participant; Rankings from AP Poll

The 2016 FIU Panthers football team represented Florida International University (FIU) in the 2016 NCAA Division I FBS football season. The Panthers played their home games at the FIU Stadium in Miami, Florida, and competed in the East Division of Conference USA (C–USA). They were led by fourth-year head coach Ron Turner until he was fired on September 25, 2016. Defensive coordinator Ron Cooper was promoted to interim head coach for the remainder of the season. They finished the season 4–8, 4–4 in C-USA play to finish in fourth place the East Division.

== Schedule ==
FIU announced its 2016 football schedule on February 4, 2016. The 2016 schedule consists of 7 home and 5 away games in the regular season. The Panthers will host C–USA foes Florida Atlantic, Louisiana Tech, Marshall, and Middle Tennessee, and will travel to Charlotte, Old Dominion, UTEP, and Western Kentucky (WKU).

The team will play four non–conference games, three home games against Indiana and Maryland both from the Big Ten Conference, and Central Florida (UCF) from the American Athletic Conference, and one road game against Massachusetts (UMass).

Date	Time	Opponent	Site	TV	Result	Attendance
September 1	7:30 p.m.	Indiana*	FIU Stadium; Miami, FL	ESPNU	L 13–34	16,089
September 9	7:30 p.m.	Maryland*	FIU Stadium; Miami, FL	CBSSN	L 14–41	17,084
September 17	3:30 p.m.	at Massachusetts*	Warren McGuirk Alumni Stadium; Hadley, MA	ASN	L 13–21	12,202
September 24	7:00 p.m.	UCF*	FIU Stadium; Miami, FL	beIN	L 14–53	18,524
October 1	7:00 p.m.	Florida Atlantic	FIU Stadium; Miami, FL (Shula Bowl)	beIN	W 33–31	16,164
October 8	8:00 p.m.	at UTEP	Sun Bowl; El Paso, TX	CUSA.tv	W 35–21	17,751
October 15	6:00 p.m.	at Charlotte	Jerry Richardson Stadium; Charlotte, NC	CUSA.tv	W 27–26	15,300
October 22	7:00 p.m.	Louisiana Tech^{†}	FIU Stadium; Miami, FL	ESPN3	L 24–44	17,061
October 29	7:00 p.m.	Middle Tennessee	FIU Stadium; Miami, FL	ESPN3	L 35–42	14,413
November 5	5:30 p.m.	at WKU	Houchens Industries–L. T. Smith Stadium; Bowling Green, KY	beIN	L 21–49	15,516
November 19	7:00 p.m.	Marshall	FIU Stadium; Miami, FL	ASN	W 31–14	15,054
November 26	3:30 p.m.	at Old Dominion	Foreman Field; Norfolk, VA (Oyster Bowl)	ESPN3	L 28–42	20,118
*Non-conference game; ^{†}Homecoming; All times are in Eastern time

Schedule source:

== Game summaries ==
=== Indiana ===
Indiana Hoosiers vs FIU Panthers – Game summary

Quarter	1	2	3	4	Total
Indiana	5	7	0	22	34
FIU	3	7	3	0	13

at FIU Stadium • Miami, Florida

- Date: September 1, 2016
- Game time: 07:30 p.m. EST
- Game weather: Temperature: 87 °F (31 °C) • Wind: 16 SE • Weather: Cloudy
- Game attendance: 16,089
- Referee: Referee: Jeff Servinski, *Umpire: Ed Feaster* Linesman: Michael Dolce * Line Judge: Paul Engelberts* Back Judge: Todd Ransom * Field Judge: Grady Smith * Side Judge: Don Sawnson * Center Judge: Patrick Holt
- TV: ESPNU
- Sources: IUHoosiers.com FIUsports.com

Game information

First Quarter

- FIU 09:40 Austin Taylor 24 yd field goal (FIU 3–0)
- IU 06:46 Team Safety (FIU 3–2)
- IU 03:17 Griffin Oakes 22 yd field goal (IU 5–3)

Second Quarter

- IU 13:00 Rashard Fant 34 yd interception return; Griffin Oakes XP Good (IU 12–3)
- FIU Alex Gardner 1 yd run; Austin Taylor XP Good (IU 12–10)

Third Quarter

- FIU 00:08 Austin Taylor 29 yd field goal (FIU 13–12)

Fourth Quarter

- IU 12:55 Danny Friend 21 yd pass from Richard Lagow; Ricky Jones 2 pt conversion good (IU 20–13)
- IU 06:54 Richard Lagow 6 yd run; Griffin Oakes XP Good (IU 27–13)
- IU 03:57 Tegray Scales 16 yd interception return; Griffin Oakes XP Good (IU 34–13)

Top Passers

- IU – Richard Lagow 18/27, 240 Yds ,1 TD
- FIU –Alex McGough 23/46, 263 YD

Top Rushers

- IU– Devine Redding 22 attempts, 135 yards
- FIU – Tony Gaiter IV 1 attempt, 27 yards

Top Receiving

- IU – Nick Westbrook 6 receptions, 70 yards
- FIU – Jonnu Smith 8 receptions, 83 yards

Top Tacklers

- IU – Jonathan Crawford 7 tackles
- FIU – Treyvon Williams 13 tackles

=== Maryland ===
Maryland Terrapins vs FIU Panthers – Game summary

Quarter	1	2	3	4	Total
Maryland	10	21	10	0	41
FIU	0	7	0	7	14

at FIU Stadium • Miami, Florida

- Date: September 9, 2016
- Game time: 07:33 p.m. EST
- Game weather: Temperature: 84 °F (29 °C) • Wind: 12 E • Weather: Mostly Cloudy / Windy
- Game attendance: 17,084
- Referee: Referee: Ron Snodgrass
- TV: CBSSN
- Sources: FIUsports.com

Game information

First Quarter

- UMD 07:51 Adam Green 23 yd field goal (UMD 3–0)
- UMD 02:33 Jermaine Carter Jr. 14 yard interception; Adam Green XP good (UMD 10–0)

Second Quarter

- UMD 12:27 Larenzo Harrington III 40 yard run; Adam Green XP good (UMD 17–0)
- FIU 09:21 Alex Gardner 4 yd run; Austin Taylor XP Good (FIU 17–7)
- UMD 07:57 D.J. Moore 45 yd pass from Perry Hills; Adam Green XP good (UMD 24-7)
- UMD 00:56 Derrick Hayward 9 yd pass from Perry Hills; Adam Green XP good (UMD 31-7)

Third Quarter

- UMD 11:10 Adam Green 28 yd field goal (UMD 34–7)
- UMD 02:21 D.J. Moore 40 yd pass from Perry Hills; Adam Green XP good (UMD 41-7)

Fourth Quarter

- FIU 09:49 Austin Maloney 4 yd pass from Maurice Alexander; Austin Taylor XP good (UMD 41–14)

Top Passers

- UMD – Perry Hills 13/18, 210 yds, 3 TD
- FIU – Maurice Alexander 9/18, 131 yds, 1 TD

Top Rushers

- UMD – Trey Edmunds 8 attempts, 78 yds
- FIU – Alex Gardner 16 attempt, 133 yds, 1 TD

Top Receiving

- UMD – D.J. Moore 6 receptions, 147 yds, 2 TD
- FIU – Jonnu Smith 5 receptions, 70 yds

Top Tacklers

- UMD – Jermaine Carter 8 tackles
- FIU – Anthony Wint 9 tackles

=== At Massachusetts ===
FIU Panthers vs UMass Minutemen – Game summary

Quarter	1	2	3	4	Total
FIU	3	0	10	0	13
UMass	0	14	7	0	21

at Warren McGuirk Alumni Stadium • Hadley, Massachusetts

- Date: September 17, 2016
- Game time: 03:37 p.m. EST
- Game weather: Temperature: 75 °F (24 °C) • Wind: 14 S • Weather: Clear
- Game attendance: 12,202
- Referee: C. Lamertina
- TV: ASN
- Sources: FIUsports.com

Game information

First Quarter

- FIU 06:32 Austin Taylor 47 yd field goal (FIU 3–0)

Second Quarter

- UMASS 09:51 Jalen Williams 26 yd pass from Andrew Ford; Mike Caggiano XP good (UMASS 7–3)
- UMASS 00:51 Andy Isabella 31 yd pass from Andrew Ford; Mike Caggiano XP good (UMASS 14–3)

Third Quarter

- FIU 09:17 Alex Gardner 2 yd run; Austin Taylor XP good (UMASS 14–10)
- FIU 04:48 Austin Taylor 35 yd field goal (UMASS 14-13)
- UMASS 01:28 Adam Brenemen 1 yd pass from Andrew Ford; Mike Caggiano XP good (UMASS 21-13)

Fourth Quarter

- No Scoring

Top Passers

- UMASS – Andrew Ford 28/42, 278 yds, 3 TD
- FIU – Alex McGough 20/34, 178 yds

Top Rushers

- UMass – Marquis Young 24 attempts, 90 yds
- FIU – Alex Gardner 23 attempts, 133 yds, 1 TD

Top Receiving

- UMass – Andy Isabella 6 receptions, 83 yds, 1 TD
- FIU – Stantly Thomas 8 receptions, 73 yds

Top Tacklers

- UMass – Steve Casali 10 tackles
- FIU – Anthony Wint 11 tackles

=== UCF ===
UCF Knights vs FIU Panthers – Game summary

Quarter	1	2	3	4	Total
UCF	15	17	14	7	53
FIU	7	0	0	7	14

at FIU Stadium • Miami, FL

- Date: September 24, 2016
- Game time: 07:04 p.m. EST
- Game weather: Temperature: 80 °F (27 °C) • Wind: 4 • Weather: Showers
- Game attendance: 18,524
- Referee: Adam Savoie
- TV: beIN
- Sources: FIUsports.com

Game information

First Quarter

- UCF 12:05 Dontravious Wilson 1 yd run; 2 pt conversion good (UCF 8–0)
- FIU 05:27 Anthoney Jones 6 yd run; Austin Taylor XP good (UCF 8-7)
- UCF 02:47 Jordan Akins 21 yd pass from McKenzie Milton; Matthew Wright XP good (UCF 15-7)

Second Quarter

- UCF 10:42 Matthew Wright 20 yd field goal (UCF 17–7)
- UCF 08:50 Dontravious Wilson 15 yd run; Matthew Wright XP good (UCF 25–7)
- UCF 03:36 Dontravious Wilson 12 yd run; Matthew Wright XP good (UCF 32-7)

Third Quarter

- UCF 08:04 Adrian Killins 61 yd run; Matthew Wright XP good (UCF 39–7)
- UCF 04:49 C.J. Jones 1 yd run; Matthew Wright XP good (UCF 46-7)

Fourth Quarter

- UCF 13:23 Nick Patti 9 yd run; Matthew Wright XP good (UCF 53-7)
- FIU 10:30 Stantly Thomas 17 yd pass from Alex McGough; Austin Taylor XP good (UCF 53-14)

Top Passers

- UCF – McKenzie Milton 8/14, 173 yds, 1 TD
- FIU – Alex McGough 5/9, 68 yds, 1 TD

Top Rushers

- UCF – Dontravious Wilson 11 attempts, 60 yds, 3 TD
- FIU – Anthony Jones 8 attempts, 36 yds, 1 TD

Top Receiving

- UCF – Jordan Akins 3 receptions, 45 yds, 1 TD
- FIU – Thomas Owens 2 receptions, 42 yds

Top Tacklers

- UCF – Shaquill Griffin 5 tackles
- FIU – Treyvon Williams 13 tackles

=== Florida Atlantic ===
FAU Owls at FIU Panthers – Game summary

Quarter	1	2	3	4	Total
FAU	7	10	14	0	31
FIU	7	7	16	3	33

at FIU Stadium • Miami, FL

- Date: October 1, 2016
- Game time: 7:04 p.m. EST
- Game weather: Temperature: 87 °F (31 °C) • Wind: • Weather: Partly Cloudy
- Game attendance: 16,164
- Referee: Rodney Burnette
- TV: beIN
- Sources: FIUsports.com

Game information

First Quarter

- FAU 14:25 Greg Howell 68 yd run; Greg Joseph XP good (FAU 7–0)
- FIU 09:03 Alex McGough 17 yd run; Austin Taylor XP good (TIED 7–7)

Second Quarter

- FIU 08:32 Alex McGough 35 yd run; Austin Taylor XP good (FIU 14–7)
- FAU 01:38 Marcus Clark 9 yd pass from Jason Driskel; Greg Joseph XP good (TIED 14–14)
- FAU 00:15 Greg Joseph 50 yd field goal (FAU 17–14)

Third Quarter

- FAU 14:42 Azee Al-Shaair 30 yd interception; Greg Joseph XP good (FAU 24-14)
- FIU 12:08 Anthony Jones 3 yd run; Austin Taylor XP good (FAU 24–21)
- FIU 11:45 Thomas Owens 26 yd pass from Alex McGough; Austin Taylor XP blocked (FIU 27–24)
- FAU 08:17 Devin Singletary 1 yd run; Greg Joseph XP good (FAU 31–27)
- FIU 03:58 Austin Taylor 37 yd field goal (FAU 31–30)

Fourth Quarter

- FIU 12:14 Austin Taylor 32 yd field goal (FIU 33–31)

Top Passers

- FAU – Jason Driskel 9/20, 92 yards, 1 TD
- FIU – Alex McGough 15/30, 199 yards, 1 TD, 2 INT

Top Rushers

- FAU – Greg Howell 12 attempts, 106 yards, 1 TD
- FIU – Alex Gardner 27 attempt, 126 yards

Top Receiving

- FAU – Tyler Cameron 3 receptions, 31 yards
- FIU – Thomas Owens 4 receptions, 61 yards, 1 TD

Top Tacklers

- FAU – Jalen Young 14 tackles
- FIU – Treyvon Williams 15 tackles

=== At UTEP ===
FIU Panthers at UTEP Miners – Game summary

Quarter	1	2	3	4	Total
FIU	3	10	15	7	35
UTEP	7	0	7	7	21

at Sun Bowl • El Paso, TX

- Date: October 8, 2016
- Game time: 8:00 p.m. EST
- Game weather: Temperature: 70 °F (21 °C) • Wind: 11 • Weather: Mostly Cloudy
- Game attendance: 17,751
- Referee: Javarro Edwards
- TV: CUSA.tv
- Sources: FIUsports.com

Game information

First Quarter

- FIU 08:43 Austin Taylor 50 yd field goal (FIU 3–0)
- UTEP 05:40 Aaron Jones 49 yd run; Jay Mattox XP good (UTEP 7–3)

Second Quarter

- FIU 07:23 AJ Bransiel 1 yd pass from Alex McGough; Austin Taylor XP good (FIU 10–7)
- FIU 02:09 Austin Taylor 24 yd field goal (FIU 13-7)

Third Quarter

- FIU 09:13 Thomas Owens 8 yd pass from Alex McGough; Austin Taylor XP good (FIU 20–7)
- UTEP 05:41 Aaron Jones 1 yd run; Jay Mattox XP good (UTEP 20–14)
- FIU 01:59 Thomas Owens 23 yd pass from Alex McGough; Stantly Thomas 2 point conversion good (FIU 28–14)

Fourth Quarter

- FIU 13:26 Alex Gardner 9 yd run; Austin Taylor XP good (FIU 35–14)
- UTEP 08:51 Cole Freytag 12 yd pass from Zack Greenlee; Jay Mattox XP good (FIU 35-21)

Top Passers

- FIU – Alex McGough 21/31, 241 yards, 3 TD, 1 INT
- UTEP – Zack Greenlee 17/39, 191 yards, 1 TD, 1 INT

Top Rushers

- FIU – Alex Gardner 21 attempts, 143 yards, 1 TD
- UTEP – Aaron Jones 8 attempt, 73 yards, 2 TD

Top Receiving

- FIU – Thomas Owens 7 receptions, 125 yards, 2 TD
- UTEP – Cole Freytag 5 receptions, 68 yards, 1 TD

Top Tacklers

- FIU – Treyvon Williams 9 tackles
- UTEP – Alvin Jones 16 tackles

=== At Charlotte ===
FIU Panthers at Charlotte 49ers – Game summary

Quarter	1	2	3	4	Total
FIU	7	3	3	14	27
Charlotte	0	10	7	9	26

at Jerry Richardson Stadium • Charlotte, NC

- Date: October 15, 2016
- Game time: 6:05 p.m. EST
- Game weather: Temperature: 70 °F (21 °C) • Wind:N 1 mph • Weather: Scattered Clouds
- Game attendance: 15,300
- Referee: Daniel Gautreau
- TV: CUSA.tv
- Source:FIUSports.com

Game information

First Quarter

- FIU 08:31 Alex McGough 19 yd run; Austin Taylor XP good (FIU 7–0)

Second Quarter

- CHA 14:10 Workpeh Kofah 12 yd pass from Hasaan Klugh; Stephen Muscarello XP good (TIED 7–7)
- FIU 06:45 Austin Taylor 21 yd field goal (FIU 10-7)
- CHA 01:04 Stephen Muscarello 29 yd field goal (TIED 10–10)

Third Quarter

- CHA 08:57 Hasaan Klugh 12 yd run; Stephen Muscarello XP good (CHA 17–10)
- FIU 02:32 Austin Taylor 23 yd field goal (CHA 17-13)

Fourth Quarter

- CHA 13:05 Robert Washington 3 yd run; (CHA 23-13)
- CHA 07:12 Stephen Muscarello 32 yd field goal (CHA 26-13)
- FIU 06:00 AJ Branisel 15 yd pass from Alex McGough; Austin Taylor XP good (CHA 26–20)
- FIU 06:00 Jonnu Smith 9 yd pass from Alex McGough; Austin Taylor XP good (FIU 27–26)

Top Passers

- FIU – Alex McGough 26/42, 315 yards, 2 TD, 2 INT
- CHA – Hasaan Klugh 21/31, 171 yards, 1 TD, 1 INT

Top Rushers

- FIU – Alex Gardner 12 attempt, 32 yards
- CHA – Kalif Phillips 24 attempts, 109 yards

Top Receiving

- FIU – Thomas Owens 11 receptions, 148 yards
- CHA – Austin Duke 3 receptions, 47 yards

Top Tacklers

- FIU – Anthony Wint 13 tackles
- CHA – Larry Ogunjobi 10 tackles

=== Louisiana Tech ===
Louisiana Tech Bulldogs at FIU Panthers – Game summary

Quarter	1	2	3	4	Total
LATECH	10	17	7	10	44
FIU	3	7	7	7	24

at FIU Stadium • Miami, FL

- Date: October 15, 2016
- Game time: 7:02 p.m. EST
- Game weather: Temperature: 77 °F (25 °C) • Wind: 10 mph • Weather: Sunny
- Game attendance: 17,061
- Referee: Joe Pester
- TV: ESPN3
- Source:FIUSports.com

Game information

First Quarter

- FIU 08:31 Austin Taylor 24 yd field goal (FIU 3–0)
- LATECH 05:48 Jonathan Barnes 42 yd field goal (TIED 3-3)
- LATECH 02:36 Ryan Higgins 6 yd run; Jonathan Barnes XP good (LATECH 10–3)

Second Quarter

- LATECH 13:19 Kam McKnight 4 yd run; Jonathan Barnes XP good (LATECH 17–3)
- LATECH 04:00 Jonathan Barnes 31 yd field goal (LATECH 20–3)
- FIU 00:52 Jonnu Smith 17 yd pass from Alex McGough (LATECH 20–10)
- LATECH 00:12 Trent Taylor 26 yd pass from Ryan Higgins; Jonathan Barnes XP good (LATECH 27–10)

Third Quarter

- FIU 09:16 Thomas Owens 30 yd pass from Alex McGough; Austin Taylor XP good (LATECH 27–17)
- LATECH 03:23 Kam McKnight 1 yd pass from Ryan Higgins; Jonathan Barnes XP good (LATECH 34–17)

Fourth Quarter

- LATECH 10:36 Jonathan Barnes 42 yd field goal (LATECH 37–17)
- FIU 06:14 Thomas Owens 6 yd pass from Alex McGough; Austin Taylor XP good (LATECH 37-24)
- LATECH 06:00 Carlos Henderson 92 yd kickoff return; Jonathan Barnes XP good (LATECH 44–24)

Top Passers

- LATECH – Ryan Higgins 22/30, 269 yards, 2 TD
- FIU – Alex McGough 25/44, 281 yards, 3 TD, 1 INT

Top Rushers

- LATECH – Jared Craft 12 attempt, 60 yards
- FIU – Alex Gardner 13 attempts, 63 yards

Top Receiving

- LATECH – Trent Taylor 11 receptions, 156 yards, 1 TD
- FIU – Thomas Owens 8 receptions, 96 yards, 2 TD

Top Tacklers

- LATECH – Jordan Harris 9 tackles
- FIU – Anthony Wint 9 tackles

=== Middle Tennessee ===
Middle Tennessee Blue Raiders at FIU Panthers – Game summary

Quarter	1	2	3	4	Total
MTSU	21	7	0	14	42
FIU	14	7	0	14	35

at FIU Stadium • Miami, FL

- Date: October 29, 2016
- Game time: 7:00 p.m. EST
- Game weather: Temperature: 77 °F (25 °C) • Wind: 11 mph • Weather: Light Rain Showers
- Game attendance: 14,413
- Referee: Stephen LaManti
- TV: ESPN3
- Sources:FIUSports.com

Game information

First Quarter

- MTTSU 13:41 Ty Lee 26 yd pass from Brent Stockstill; Canon Rooker XP good (MTTSU 7–0)
- MTTSU 11:04 Ty Lee 19 yd pass from Brent Stockstill; Canon Rooker XP good (MTSU 14-0)
- MTTSU 09:09 I'Tavius Mathers 9 yd run; Canon Rooker XP good (MTSU 21–0)
- FIU 06:58 Jonnu Smith 27 yd pass from Alex McGough; Austin Taylor XP good (MTSU 21–7)
- FIU 01:42 Thomas Owens 10 yd pass from Alex McGough; Austin Taylor XP good (MTSU 21–14)

Second Quarter

- MTTSU 03:53 Richie James 15 yd pass from Brent Stockstill; Canon Rooker XP good (MTTSU 28–14)
- FIU 00:35 Alex McGough 7 yd run; Austin Taylor XP good (MTSU 28–21)

Third Quarter
Fourth Quarter

- FIU 12:45 Thomas Owens 24 yd pass from Alex McGough; Austin Taylor XP good (TIED 28–28)
- MTSU 11:58 Richie James 52 yd pass from Brent Stockstill; Canon Rooker XP good (MTSU 35-24)
- FIU 05:43 Anthony Jones 1 yd run; Austin Taylor XP good (TIED 35–35)
- MTSU 01:22 DJ Sanders 48 yd interception; Canon Rooker XP good (MTSU 42–35)

Top Passers

- MTSU – Brent Stockstill 21/34, 318 yards, 4 TD
- FIU – Alex McGough 27/40, 307 yards, 3 TD, 1 INT

Top Rushers

- MTSU – I'Tavius Mathers 15 attempt, 127 yards, 1 TD
- FIU – Alex Gardner 19 attempts, 95 yards

Top Receiving

- MTSU – James Richie 6 receptions, 127 yards, 2 TD
- FIU – Thomas Owens 6 receptions, 93 yards, 2 TD

Top Tacklers

- MTSU – Randolph Darryl 10 tackles
- FIU – Anthony Wint 7 tackles

=== At WKU ===
FIU Panthers at Western Kentucky Hilltoppers – Game summary

Quarter	1	2	3	4	Total
FIU	7	0	0	14	21
WKU	14	21	14	0	49

at Houchens Industries–L. T. Smith Stadium • Bowling Green, KY

- Date: November 5, 2016
- Game time: 4:30 p.m. EST
- Game weather: Temperature: 68 °F (20 °C) • Wind:NE 4 mph • Weather: Sunny
- Game attendance: 15,516
- Referee: Ken Antee
- TV: beIN
- Sources:FIUSports.com

Game information

First Quarter

- WKU 09:51 Quinton Baker 10 yd run; Skyler Simcox XP good (WKU 7–0)
- WKU 03:10 Anthony Wales 1 yd run; Skyler Simcox XP good (WKU 14-0)
- FIU 00:07 Maurice Alexander 2 yd run; Austin Taylor XP good (WKU 14–7)

Second Quarter

- WKU 14:50 Taywan Taylor 41 yd pass from Mike White; Skyler Simcox XP good (WKU 21–7)
- WKU 11:33 Leverick Johnson 61 yd interception; Skyler Simcox XP good (WKU 28–7)
- WKU 00:38 Anthony Wales 5 yd run; Skyler Simcox XP good (WKU 35–7)

Third Quarter

- WKU 14:41 Anthony Wales 59 yd interception; Skyler Simcox XP good (WKU 42–7)
- WKU 10:36 Anthony Wales 10 yd run; Skyler Simcox XP good (WKU 49–7)

Fourth Quarter

- FIU 09:29 Shug Oyegunle 11 yd pass from Christian Alexander; Austin Taylor XP good (WKU 49–14)
- FIU 08:22 Austin Maloney 12 yd pass from Christian Alexander; Austin Taylor XP good (WKU 49-21)

Top Passers

- FIU – Christian Alexander 8/11, 81 yards, 2 TD
- WKU – Mike White 16/23, 274 yards, 1 TD

Top Rushers

- FIU – Maurice Alexander 11 attempt, 62 yards, 1 TD
- WKU – Anthony Wales 12 attempts, 111 yards, 4 TD

Top Receiving

- FIU – Darius Scott 5 receptions, 56 yards
- WKU – Thomas Owens 5 receptions, 97 yards, 1 TD

Top Tacklers

- FIU – Sage Lewis 7 tackles
- WKU – Keith Brown 11 tackles

=== Marshall ===
Marshall Thundering Herd at FIU Panthers – Game summary

Quarter	1	2	3	4	Total
Marshall	7	0	0	7	14
FIU	7	7	3	14	31

at FIU Stadium • Miami, FL

- Date: November 19, 2016
- Game time: 7:00 p.m. EST
- Game weather: Temperature: 72 °F (22 °C) • Wind:N-NE 5 mph • Weather: Mostly Cloudy
- Game attendance: 15,054
- Referee: S. LaMantia
- TV: ASN
- Sources:FIUSports.com

Game information

First Quarter

- FIU 13:34 Alex Gardner 14 yd run; Austin Taylor XP good (FIU 7–0)
- MAR 01:40 Emanuel Byrd 17 yd pass from Chase Litton; Amoreto Curraj XP good (TIED 7-7)

Second Quarter

- FIU 00:38 AJ Branisel 3 yd pass from Christian Alexander; Austin Taylor XP good (FIU 14–7)

Third Quarter

- FIU 00:59 Austin Taylor 29 yd Field Goal good (FIU 17–7)

Fourth Quarter

- FIU 06:04 Anthony Jones 8 yd run; Austin Taylor XP good (FIU 24–7)
- MAR 03:53 Deon-Tay McManus 24 yd pass from Chase Litton; Amoreto Curraj XP good (FIU 24-14)
- FIU 02:13 Alex Gardner 8 yd run; Austin Taylor XP good (FIU 31–14)

Top Passers

- MAR – Chase Litton 29/42, 301 yards, 2 TD, 2 INT
- FIU – Maurice Alexander 14/20, 204 yards

Top Rushers

- MAR – Anthony Anderson 11 attempt, 56 yards
- FIU – Anthony Jones 17 attempts, 122 yards, 1 TD

Top Receiving

- MAR – Deon-Tay McManus 10 receptions, 151 yards, 1 TD
- FIU – AJ Branisel 3 receptions, 42 yards, 1 TD

Top Tacklers

- MAR – Kendall Gant & Corey Neely, 12 tackles
- FIU – Treyvon Williams 11 tackles

=== At Old Dominion ===
FIU Panthers at Old Dominion Monarchs – Game summary

Quarter	1	2	3	4	Total
FIU	7	7	7	7	28
ODU	14	0	14	14	42

at Foreman Field • Norfolk, VA

- Date: November 26, 2016
- Game time: 3:30 p.m. EST
- Game weather: Temperature: 53 °F (12 °C) • Wind:NW 13 mph • Weather: Sunny
- Referee: Jay Edwards
- TV: ESPN3
- Sources:FIUSports.com

Game information

First Quarter

- ODU 13:09 Ray Lawry 22 yd run; Brad Davis XP good (ODU 7–0)
- FIU 09:39 Jonnu Smith 26 yd pass from Maurice Alexander; Austin Taylor XP good (TIED 7-7)
- ODU 03:00 Zach Pascal 11 yd pass from David Washington; Brad Davis XP good (ODU 14–7)

Second Quarter

- FIU 00:51 AJ Branisel 18 yd pass from Christian Alexander; Austin Taylor XP good (TIED 14–14)

Third Quarter

- FIU 14:15 Isiah Brown 45 yd intercerption; Austin Taylor XP good (FIU 21–14)
- ODU 12:07 Ray Lawry 2 yd run; Brad Davis XP good (TIED 21–21)
- ODU 05:22 Travis Fulgham 18 yd pass from David Washington; Brad Davis XP good (ODU 28–21)

Fourth Quarter

- ODU 13:50 Jeremy Cox 6 yd run; Brad Davis XP good (ODU 35–21)
- ODU 10:43 Ray Lawry 24 yd run; Brad Davis XP good (ODU 42-21)
- FIU 01:23 Christian Alexander 20 yd run; Austin Taylor XP good (ODU 42–28)

Top Passers

- FIU – Christian Alexander 8/17, 82 yards, 1 TD
- ODU – David Washington 9/17, 141 yards, 2 TD, 1 INT

Top Rushers

- FIU – Alex Gardner 10 attempt, 54 yards
- ODU – Ray Lawry 24 attempts, 194 yards, 3 TD

Top Receiving

- FIU – Jonnu Smith 2 receptions, 50 yards, 1 TD
- ODU – Zach Pascal 8 receptions, 101 yards, 1 TD

Top Tacklers

- FIU – Anthony Wint 10 tackles
- ODU – Anthony Wilson 7 tackles

== Awards and honors ==
=== Conference USA Players of the Week ===
Weekly Awards
Player	Award	Date Awarded	Ref.
Anthony Wint	Conference USA Defensive Player of the Week	October 3, 2016	
Anthony Wint	Conference USA Defensive Player of the Week	October 17, 2016	

=== Awards ===
Player	Award	Date Awarded	Ref.
Jonnu Smith	Second team All-Conference USA	December 6, 2016	
Anthony Wint	Second team All-Conference USA	December 6, 2016	
Stantley Thomas-Oliver	All-Freshman Team	December 6, 2016	
