= 2016 Conference USA Football Championship Game =

2016 Dynacraft Conference USA Football Championship Game
- Conference Championship
Louisiana Tech Bulldogs	WKU Hilltoppers
(8–4)	(9–3)
44	58
Head coach: Skip Holtz	Head coach: Jeff Brohm
	1	2	3	4	Total
Louisiana Tech	17	10	14	3	44
WKU	24	14	10	10	58
- Date: December 3, 2016
- Season: 2016
- Stadium: Houchens Industries–L. T. Smith Stadium
- Location: Bowling Green, Kentucky
- MVP: RB Anthony Wales (WKU)
- Favorite: Western Kentucky by 12
- Referee: Rodney Burnette
- Attendance: 13,213

United States TV coverage
- Network: ESPN/TuneIn
- Announcers: Dave Pasch, Tom Luginbill, Quint Kessenich (ESPN); TJ Rives, Kelly Holcomb (Tag Sports Group on TuneIn)

2016 Conference USA football standings
	Conf.			Overall
Team	W		L	W		L
East Division
Western Kentucky xy$	7	–	1	11	–	3
Old Dominion x	7	–	1	10	–	3
Middle Tennessee	5	–	3	8	–	5
FIU	4	–	4	4	–	8
Charlotte	3	–	5	4	–	8
Marshall	2	–	6	3	–	9
Florida Atlantic	2	–	6	3	–	9
West Division
Louisiana Tech xy	6	–	2	9	–	5
UTSA	5	–	3	6	–	7
Southern Miss	4	–	4	7	–	6
North Texas	3	–	5	5	–	8
Rice	2	–	6	3	–	9
UTEP	2	–	6	4	–	8
Championship: Western Kentucky 58, Louisiana Tech 44
$ – Conference champion; x – Division champion/co-champions; y – Championship game participant; Rankings from AP Poll

The 2016 Conference USA Championship Game was played on Saturday, December 3, 2016, at Houchens Industries–L. T. Smith Stadium in Bowling Green, Kentucky, and determined the 2016 football champion of Conference USA (C-USA). The game featured the West Division champion Louisiana Tech visiting the East Division champion Western Kentucky Hilltoppers (WKU), with the Hilltoppers winning 58–44. The game was broadcast nationally by ESPN for the 5th consecutive year. The title sponsor was Dynacraft BSC.

If winner of the C-USA Championship Game is one of highest ranked in the rankings of the "Group of Five" conferences, the team could be placed in the playoffs if not then the Cotton Bowl. The conference champion if not selected would then pick a bowl game of their choosing to attend that has ties to the conference.

The 2016 championship game was the 12th game in the championship series. In the 2015 championship game, also hosted by WKU, the Hilltoppers defeated Southern Miss, 45–28.

The game proved to be the last for Jeff Brohm as WKU's head coach; two days later, he was hired to fill the head coaching vacancy at Purdue.

== Teams ==
=== Louisiana Tech ===
The Bulldogs got off to a rough start at 1–2 before going into conference play with a close 21–20 loss to Arkansas. Louisiana Tech lost its first conference game against Middle Tennessee in which the Bulldogs lost the game in the last quarter when the Blue Raiders scored 21 points to win 38–34. The Bulldogs then went undefeated in conference play before losing their regular-season finale 39–24 to Southern Miss on November 26. They had already clinched the West Division title on November 12 by defeating UTSA, winning the division title for the second time in school history. The previous time the Bulldogs won the West Division was back in 2014, which resulted in the Bulldogs losing by 3 points to Marshall.

=== Western Kentucky ===
WKU opened the season with a conference win over Rice, and then went 2–2 in its nonconference schedule, with both losses to Southeastern Conference teams. WKU then resumed its conference schedule at Louisiana Tech, losing 55–52, before winning its final six regular-season games, finishing C-USA play as East Division co-champions along with Old Dominion. Both teams finished 7–1 in C-USA play, with WKU holding the tiebreaker with a 59–24 win over Old Dominion on October 22. Entering the final weekend of conference play, the Hilltoppers could have been beaten out for hosting rights by Louisiana Tech, which entered that weekend 6–1 in the conference and held the head-to-head tiebreaker with its win over WKU. However, the Bulldogs lost on November 26 to Southern Miss, leaving them at 6–2 in C-USA play. WKU hosted the championship for the second consecutive season, making it the first C-USA school to ever do so.

== Game summary ==
WKU hosted the Bulldogs of Louisiana Tech at Houchens Industries–L. T. Smith Stadium in Bowling Green, Kentucky at noon Eastern Time on December 3, 2016, and was broadcast on ESPN. Louisiana Tech held the overall series record over the Hilltoppers 4–2 before the matchup. The Bulldogs defeated the Hilltoppers in the last meeting back in the beginning of the season on October 6, 55–52.

=== Scoring summary ===
Scoring summary

Quarter	Time	Drive			Team	Scoring information	Score	
Quarter	Time	Plays	Yards	TOP	Team	Scoring information	LATECH	WKU
1	11:56	8	54	3:04	WKU	32-yard field goal by Skyler Simcox	0	3
1	10:18	5	76	1:38	LATECH	25-yard field goal by Jonathan Barnes	3	3
1	7:40	7	70	2:38	WKU	Anthony Wales 15-yard touchdown run, Skyler Simcox kick good	3	10
1	5:43				LATECH	Interception returned 48 yards for touchdown by L'Jarius Sneed, Jonathan Barnes kick good	10	10
1	3:38	6	75	2:05	WKU	Anthony Wales 26-yard touchdown run, Skyler Simcox kick good	10	17
1	1:34	7	63	2:04	LATECH	Carlos Henderson 6-yard touchdown reception from Ryan Higgins, Jonathan Barnes kick good	17	17
1	0:00	3	63	1:34	WKU	Anthony Wales 10-yard touchdown reception from Mike White, Skyler Simcox kick good	17	24
2	11:06	8	79	3:54	LATECH	Jarred Craft 5-yard touchdown reception from Ryan Higgins, Jonathan Barnes kick good	24	24
2	10:17	2	72	0:49	WKU	Taywan Taylor 45-yard touchdown reception from Mike White, Skyler Simcox kick good	24	31
2	8:26	7	72	1:51	LATECH	36-yard field goal by Jonathan Barnes	27	31
2	5:05	7	23	3:21	WKU	Taywan Taylor 4-yard touchdown reception from Mike White, Skyler Simcox kick good	27	38
3	13:15	5	65	1:45	LATECH	Kameron McKnight 53-yard touchdown reception from Ryan Higgins, Jonathan Barnes kick good	34	38
3	10:17	7	29	2:58	LATECH	Kameron McKnight 1-yard touchdown run, Jonathan Barnes kick good	41	38
3	4:05	10	55	4:32	WKU	28-yard field goal by Skyler Simcox	41	41
3	4:05	2	40	0:48	WKU	Anthony Wales 15-yard touchdown run, Skyler Simcox kick good	41	48
4	14:08	15	72	4:57	LATECH	24-yard field goal by Jonathan Barnes	44	48
4	7:19	9	63	4:57	WKU	34-yard field goal by Skyler Simcox	44	51
4	0:58	9	83	4:57	WKU	Anthony Wales 13-yard touchdown run, Skyler Simcox kick good	44	58
"TOP" = time of possession. For other American football terms, see Glossary of American football.							44	58

=== Statistics ===
Statistics	LA Tech	WKU
First downs	26	31
Plays–yards	79–507	72–656
Rushes–yards	22–5	41–235
Passing yards	421	502
Passing: Comp–Att–Int	35–57–1	21–31–1
Time of possession	28:24	31:36
