= 2016 Louisiana Tech Bulldogs football team =

American college football season

2016 Louisiana Tech Bulldogs football

C-USA West Division champion Armed Forces Bowl champion

C-USA Championship Game, L 44–58 vs. WKU

Armed Forces Bowl, W 48–45 vs. Navy
- Conference: Conference USA
- West Division
- Record: 9–5 (6–2 C-USA)
- Head coach: Skip Holtz (4th season)
- Offensive coordinator: Todd Fitch (1st season)
- Offensive scheme: Multiple
- Defensive coordinator: Blake Baker (2nd season)
- Base defense: 4–3
- Home stadium: Joe Aillet Stadium

2016 Conference USA football standings
	Conf.			Overall
Team	W		L	W		L
East Division
Western Kentucky xy$	7	–	1	11	–	3
Old Dominion x	7	–	1	10	–	3
Middle Tennessee	5	–	3	8	–	5
FIU	4	–	4	4	–	8
Charlotte	3	–	5	4	–	8
Marshall	2	–	6	3	–	9
Florida Atlantic	2	–	6	3	–	9
West Division
Louisiana Tech xy	6	–	2	9	–	5
UTSA	5	–	3	6	–	7
Southern Miss	4	–	4	7	–	6
North Texas	3	–	5	5	–	8
Rice	2	–	6	3	–	9
UTEP	2	–	6	4	–	8
Championship: Western Kentucky 58, Louisiana Tech 44
$ – Conference champion; x – Division champion/co-champions; y – Championship game participant; Rankings from AP Poll

The 2016 Louisiana Tech Bulldogs football team represented Louisiana Tech University in the 2016 NCAA Division I FBS football season. The Bulldogs played their home games at the Joe Aillet Stadium in Ruston, Louisiana, and competed in the West Division of Conference USA (C–USA). They were led by fourth-year head coach Skip Holtz. They finished the season 9–5, 6–2 in C-USA play to be champions of the West Division. They represented the West Division in the Conference USA Championship Game where they lost to WKU. They were invited to the Armed Forces Bowl where they defeated Navy. The Louisiana Tech offense became the first team in NCAA Division 1 history to have a QB pass for 4,500+ yards, a RB rush for 1,000+ yards and two WRs with 1,500+ receiving yards all in a single season.

== Schedule ==
Louisiana Tech announced its 2016 football schedule on February 4, 2016. The schedule consisted of five home games and seven away games in the regular season.

Date	Time	Opponent	Site	TV	Result	Attendance
September 3	3:00 pm	at Arkansas*	Donald W. Reynolds Razorback Stadium; Fayetteville, AR	SECN	L 20–21	69,132
September 10	6:00 pm	South Carolina State*	Joe Aillet Stadium; Ruston, LA		W 53–24	16,910
September 17	6:00 pm	at Texas Tech*	Jones AT&T Stadium; Lubbock, TX	FSN	L 45–59	59,515
September 24	6:00 pm	at Middle Tennessee	Johnny "Red" Floyd Stadium; Murfreesboro, TN	ASN	L 34–38	20,105
October 1	6:00 pm	UTEP	Joe Aillet Stadium; Ruston, LA	ASN	W 28–7	22,101
October 6	7:00 pm	Western Kentucky	Joe Aillet Stadium; Ruston, LA	CBSSN	W 55–52	17,978
October 15	2:30 pm	at UMass*	Gillette Stadium; Foxborough, MA	ASN	W 56–28	13,311
October 22	6:00 pm	at FIU	FIU Stadium; Miami, FL	ESPN3	W 44–24	17,061
October 29	6:00 pm	Rice	Joe Aillet Stadium; Ruston, LA	CI	W 61–16	22,058
November 5	4:30 pm	at North Texas	Apogee Stadium; Denton, TX	ESPN3	W 45–24	21,643
November 12	2:30 pm	UTSA^{†}	Joe Aillet Stadium; Ruston, LA	ESPN3	W 63–35	23,012
November 25	3:00 pm	at Southern Miss	M. M. Roberts Stadium; Hattiesburg, MS (Rivalry in Dixie)	ESPNews	L 24–39	26,164
December 3	11:00 am	at Western Kentucky	Houchens Industries–L. T. Smith Stadium; Bowling Green, KY (C–USA Championship Game)	ESPN	L 44–58	13,213
December 23	3:30 pm	vs. No. 25 Navy*	Amon G. Carter Stadium; Fort Worth, TX (Armed Forces Bowl)	ESPN	W 48–45	40,542
*Non-conference game; ^{†}Homecoming; Rankings from AP Poll released prior to the game; All times are in Central time

== Game summaries ==
=== At Arkansas ===
	1	2	3	4	Total
Bulldogs	7	7	6	0	20
Razorbacks	7	7	0	7	21

=== South Carolina State ===
	1	2	3	4	Total
SCSU Bulldogs	0	10	0	14	24
LT Bulldogs	12	7	20	14	53

=== At Texas Tech ===
	1	2	3	4	Total
Bulldogs	3	14	14	14	45
Red Raiders	21	14	7	17	59

=== At Middle Tennessee ===
	1	2	3	4	Total
Bulldogs	7	13	7	7	34
Blue Raiders	7	0	10	21	38

=== UTEP ===
	1	2	3	4	Total
Miners	0	0	0	7	7
Bulldogs	14	0	0	14	28

=== WKU ===
	1	2	3	4	Total
Hilltoppers	14	10	7	21	52
Bulldogs	21	14	17	3	55

=== At UMass ===
	1	2	3	4	Total
Bulldogs	7	21	14	14	56
Minutemen	7	7	7	7	28

=== At FIU ===
	1	2	3	4	Total
Bulldogs	10	17	7	10	44
Panthers	14	10	0	0	24

=== Rice ===
	1	2	3	4	Total
Owls	0	0	9	7	16
Bulldogs	28	13	13	7	61

=== At North Texas ===
	1	2	3	4	Total
Bulldogs	14	17	7	7	45
Mean Green	7	14	3	0	24

=== UTSA ===
	1	2	3	4	Total
Roadrunners	7	7	0	21	35
Bulldogs	14	21	7	21	63

=== At Southern Miss ===
	1	2	3	4	Total
Bulldogs	7	10	0	7	24
Golden Eagles	10	13	6	10	39

=== Vs. WKU–C-USA Championship Game ===
	1	2	3	4	Total
Bulldogs	17	10	14	3	44
Hilltoppers	24	14	10	10	58

=== Vs. Navy–Armed Forces Bowl ===
	1	2	3	4	Total
Bulldogs	17	14	0	17	48
Midshipmen	7	17	7	14	45
