= 2016 Western Kentucky Hilltoppers football team =

American college football season

2016 Western Kentucky Hilltoppers football

C-USA champion C-USA East Division co-champion Boca Raton Bowl champion

C-USA Championship Game, W 58–44 vs. Louisiana Tech

Boca Raton Bowl, W 51–31 vs. Memphis
- Conference: Conference USA
- East Division
- Record: 11–3 (7–1 C-USA)
- Head coach: Jeff Brohm (3rd season; regular season); Nick Holt (interim; bowl game)
- Co-offensive coordinators: Brian Brohm (1st season); Tony Levine (1st season)
- Offensive scheme: Spread
- Defensive coordinator: Nick Holt (4th season)
- Base defense: 4–3
- Home stadium: Houchens Industries–L. T. Smith Stadium

2016 Conference USA football standings
	Conf.			Overall
Team	W		L	W		L
East Division
Western Kentucky xy$	7	–	1	11	–	3
Old Dominion x	7	–	1	10	–	3
Middle Tennessee	5	–	3	8	–	5
FIU	4	–	4	4	–	8
Charlotte	3	–	5	4	–	8
Marshall	2	–	6	3	–	9
Florida Atlantic	2	–	6	3	–	9
West Division
Louisiana Tech xy	6	–	2	9	–	5
UTSA	5	–	3	6	–	7
Southern Miss	4	–	4	7	–	6
North Texas	3	–	5	5	–	8
Rice	2	–	6	3	–	9
UTEP	2	–	6	4	–	8
Championship: Western Kentucky 58, Louisiana Tech 44
$ – Conference champion; x – Division champion/co-champions; y – Championship game participant; Rankings from AP Poll

The 2016 Western Kentucky Hilltoppers football team represented Western Kentucky University (WKU) in the 2016 NCAA Division I FBS football season. The Hilltoppers played their home games at the Houchens Industries–L. T. Smith Stadium in Bowling Green, Kentucky, and competed in the East Division of Conference USA (C–USA). They were led by third year head coach Jeff Brohm. They finished the season 11–3, 7–1 in C-USA play to win a share of the East Division title with Old Dominion. Due to their head-to-head victory over Old Dominion, Western Kentucky represented the East Division in the Conference USA Championship Game where they defeated Louisiana Tech to be crowned C-USA champions. They were invited to the Boca Raton Bowl where they defeated Memphis. This team led the NCAA in Scoring Offense.

On December 5, head coach Jeff Brohm resigned to become the head coach at Purdue. He finished at WKU with a record of 30–10, two bowl wins, and two C-USA titles. Defensive coordinator Nick Holt led the Hilltoppers in the Boca Raton Bowl.

== Schedule ==
Western Kentucky announced its 2016 football schedule on February 4, 2016. The 2016 schedule consisted of 6 home and away games in the regular season. The Hilltoppers hosted C–USA foes Florida International (FIU), North Texas, Old Dominion, and Rice, and traveled to Florida Atlantic, Louisiana Tech, Marshall, and Middle Tennessee.

Western Kentucky's four non-conference games included two home games against Houston Baptist from the Southland Conference and Vanderbilt from the Southeastern Conference (SEC), and two road games against Alabama from the SEC and Miami (Ohio) from the Mid-American Conference (MAC).

Date	Time	Opponent	Site	TV	Result	Attendance
September 1	7:00 p.m.	Rice	Houchens Industries–L. T. Smith Stadium; Bowling Green, KY	CBSSN	W 46–14	19,286
September 10	2:30 p.m.	at No. 1 Alabama*	Bryant–Denny Stadium; Tuscaloosa, AL	ESPN2	L 10–38	101,821
September 17	2:30 p.m.	at Miami (OH)*	Yager Stadium; Oxford, OH	ESPN3	W 31–24	19,822
September 24	3:30 p.m.	Vanderbilt*	Houchens Industries–L. T. Smith Stadium; Bowling Green, KY	CBSSN	L 30–31 ^{OT}	23,674
October 1	6:00 p.m.	Houston Baptist*	Houchens Industries–L. T. Smith Stadium; Bowling Green, KY	CUSA.tv	W 50–3	17,331
October 6	7:00 p.m.	at Louisiana Tech	Joe Aillet Stadium; Ruston, LA	CBSSN	L 52–55	17,978
October 15	1:30 p.m.	at Middle Tennessee	Johnny "Red" Floyd Stadium; Murfreesboro, TN (100 Miles of Hate)	ESPN3	W 44–43 ^{2OT}	22,411
October 22	6:00 p.m.	Old Dominion	Houchens Industries–L. T. Smith Stadium; Bowling Green, KY	ASN	W 59–24	18,676
October 29	2:30 p.m.	at Florida Atlantic	FAU Stadium; Boca Raton, FL	ASN	W 52–3	9,338
November 5	4:30 p.m.	FIU	Houchens Industries–L. T. Smith Stadium; Bowling Green, KY	beIN	W 49–21	15,516
November 12	2:30 p.m.	North Texas	Houchens Industries–L. T. Smith Stadium; Bowling Green, KY	ESPN3	W 45–7	16,239
November 26	6:00 p.m.	at Marshall	Joan C. Edwards Stadium; Huntington, WV	ESPNU	W 60–6	17,397
December 3	11:00 a.m.	Louisiana Tech	Houchens Industries–L. T. Smith Stadium; Bowling Green, KY (C–USA Championship Game)	ESPN	W 58–44	13,213
December 20	6:00 p.m.	vs. Memphis*	FAU Stadium; Boca Raton, FL (Boca Raton Bowl)	ESPN	W 51–31	24,726
*Non-conference game; Rankings from AP Poll released prior to game; All times are in Central time

== Game summaries ==
=== Rice ===
	1	2	3	4	Total
Owls	0	7	7	0	14
Hilltoppers	16	14	6	10	46

=== At Alabama ===
	1	2	3	4	Total
Hilltoppers	3	0	0	7	10
#1 Crimson Tide	10	7	7	14	38

=== At Miami (OH) ===
	1	2	3	4	Total
Hilltoppers	0	14	10	7	31
RedHawks	0	3	14	7	24

=== Vanderbilt ===
	1	2	3	4	OT	Total
Commodores	0	7	7	10	7	31
Hilltoppers	7	7	0	10	6	30

=== Houston Baptist ===
	1	2	3	4	Total
Huskies	3	0	0	0	3
Hilltoppers	14	16	20	0	50

=== At Louisiana Tech ===
	1	2	3	4	Total
Hilltoppers	14	10	7	21	52
Bulldogs	21	14	17	3	55

=== At Middle Tennessee ===
	1	2	3	4	OT	2OT	Total
Hilltoppers	3	17	7	3	7	7	44
Blue Raiders	3	17	0	10	7	6	43

=== Old Dominion ===
	1	2	3	4	Total
Monarchs	0	14	10	0	24
Hilltoppers	21	31	0	7	59

=== At Florida Atlantic ===
	1	2	3	4	Total
Hilltoppers	14	10	14	14	52
Owls	0	3	0	0	3

=== FIU ===
	1	2	3	4	Total
Panthers	7	0	0	14	21
Hilltoppers	14	21	14	0	49

=== North Texas ===
	1	2	3	4	Total
Mean Green	0	0	7	0	7
Hilltoppers	17	14	14	0	45

=== At Marshall ===
	1	2	3	4	Total
Hilltoppers	28	13	9	10	60
Thundering Herd	0	0	6	0	6

=== Vs. Louisiana Tech–C-USA Championship Game ===
	1	2	3	4	Total
Bulldogs	17	10	14	3	44
Hilltoppers	24	14	10	10	58

=== Vs. Memphis–Boca Raton Bowl ===
	1	2	3	4	Total
Tigers	10	7	7	7	31
Hilltoppers	14	14	16	7	51

== Rankings ==
Ranking movements Legend: ██ Increase in ranking ██ Decrease in ranking — = Not ranked RV = Received votes
	Week															
Poll	Pre	1	2	3	4	5	6	7	8	9	10	11	12	13	14	Final
AP	RV	—	—	—	—	—	—	—	—	—	—	RV	—	—	RV	RV
Coaches	RV	RV	RV	RV	—	—	—	—	—	—	—	—	—	RV	RV	RV
CFP	Not released									—	—	—	—	—	—	Not released
