= 2016 Old Dominion Monarchs football team =

American college football season

2016 Old Dominion Monarchs football

C-USA East Division co-champion Bahamas Bowl champion

Bahamas Bowl, W 24–20 vs. Eastern Michigan
- Conference: Conference USA
- East Division
- Record: 10–3 (7–1 C-USA)
- Head coach: Bobby Wilder (8th season)
- Offensive coordinator: Brian Scott (8th season)
- Offensive scheme: Hurry-up spread option
- Defensive coordinator: Rich Nagy (4th season)
- Base defense: 3–3–5
- Home stadium: Foreman Field at S. B. Ballard Stadium

2016 Conference USA football standings
	Conf.			Overall
Team	W		L	W		L
East Division
Western Kentucky xy$	7	–	1	11	–	3
Old Dominion x	7	–	1	10	–	3
Middle Tennessee	5	–	3	8	–	5
FIU	4	–	4	4	–	8
Charlotte	3	–	5	4	–	8
Marshall	2	–	6	3	–	9
Florida Atlantic	2	–	6	3	–	9
West Division
Louisiana Tech xy	6	–	2	9	–	5
UTSA	5	–	3	6	–	7
Southern Miss	4	–	4	7	–	6
North Texas	3	–	5	5	–	8
Rice	2	–	6	3	–	9
UTEP	2	–	6	4	–	8
Championship: Western Kentucky 58, Louisiana Tech 44
$ – Conference champion; x – Division champion/co-champions; y – Championship game participant; Rankings from AP Poll

The 2016 Old Dominion Monarchs football team represented Old Dominion University in the 2016 NCAA Division I FBS football season. The Monarchs played their home games at the Foreman Field at S. B. Ballard Stadium in Norfolk, Virginia and competed in the East Division of Conference USA (C–USA). They were led by eighth-year head coach Bobby Wilder. They finished the season 10–3, 7–1 in C-USA play to finish in a tie for the East Division championship. Due to their head-to-head loss to WKU, they did not represent the East Division in the C-USA Championship Game. They were invited to the Bahamas Bowl, their first ever bowl appearance, where they defeated Eastern Michigan for their first ever bowl victory.

== Schedule ==
Old Dominion announced its 2016 football schedule on February 4, 2016. The 2016 schedule consists of 6 home and away games in the regular season. The Monarchs hosted C–USA foes Florida International (FIU), Marshall, Southern Miss, and UTSA, and traveled to Charlotte, Florida Atlantic, UTEP, and Western Kentucky (WKU).

The team played four non–conference games, two home games against Hampton from the Mid-Eastern Athletic Conference and Massachusetts, and two road games against Appalachian State from the Sun Belt Conference and NC State from the Atlantic Coast Conference (ACC).

Date	Time	Opponent	Site	TV	Result	Attendance
September 4	3:30 p.m.	Hampton*	Foreman Field; Norfolk, VA	CUSA.tv	W 54–21	20,118
September 10	3:30 p.m.	at Appalachian State*	Kidd Brewer Stadium; Boone, NC	ASN	L 7–31	23,374
September 17	6:00 p.m.	at NC State*	Carter–Finley Stadium; Raleigh, NC	ACCN+	L 22–49	57,810
September 24	3:30 p.m.	UTSA^{†}	Foreman Field; Norfolk, VA	WTVZ	W 33–19	20,118
October 1	6:00 p.m.	at Charlotte	Jerry Richardson Stadium; Charlotte, NC	CUSA.tv	W 52–17	12,589
October 7^{[a]}	8:00 p.m.	Massachusetts*	Foreman Field; Norfolk, VA	CUSA.tv	W 36–16	20,118
October 22	7:00 p.m.	at WKU	Houchens Industries–L. T. Smith Stadium; Bowling Green, KY	ASN	L 24–59	18,676
October 29	8:00 p.m.	at UTEP	Sun Bowl; El Paso, TX	CUSA.tv	W 31–21	19,254
November 5	7:00 p.m.	Marshall	Foreman Field; Norfolk, VA	ASN	W 38–14	20,118
November 12	3:30 p.m.	Southern Miss	Foreman Field; Norfolk, VA	ASN	W 51–35	20,118
November 19	6:00 p.m.	at Florida Atlantic	FAU Stadium; Boca Raton, FL	CI	W 42–24	5,843
November 26	3:30 p.m.	FIU	Foreman Field; Norfolk, VA (Oyster Bowl)	ESPN3	W 42–28	20,118
December 23	1:00 p.m.	vs. Eastern Michigan*	Thomas Robinson Stadium; Nassau, Bahamas (Bahamas Bowl)	ESPN	W 24–20	13,422
*Non-conference game; ^{†}Homecoming; All times are in Eastern time

^{^[a]}The game between Old Dominion and Massachusetts on October 8, 2016, was rescheduled due to Hurricane Matthew. The game was moved a day sooner on October 7, 2016 with an 8:00pm kickoff.

== Game summaries ==
=== Hampton ===
	1	2	3	4	Total
Pirates	7	7	7	0	21
Monarchs	14	17	9	14	54

This win marked the 100th win in Monarchs football history (1930–40, 2009-).

=== At Appalachian State ===
	1	2	3	4	Total
Monarchs	0	7	0	0	7
Mountaineers	14	10	0	7	31

=== At NC State ===
	1	2	3	4	Total
Monarchs	0	3	6	13	22
Wolfpack	7	14	14	14	49

=== UTSA ===
	1	2	3	4	Total
Roadrunners	0	7	12	0	19
Monarchs	6	7	12	8	33

=== At Charlotte ===
	1	2	3	4	Total
Monarchs	21	10	21	0	52
49ers	3	7	0	7	17

=== Massachusetts ===
	1	2	3	4	Total
Minutemen	0	9	7	0	16
Monarchs	10	9	10	7	36

=== At Western Kentucky ===
	1	2	3	4	Total
Monarchs	0	14	10	0	24
Hilltoppers	21	31	0	7	59

=== At UTEP ===
	1	2	3	4	Total
Monarchs	10	0	7	14	31
Miners	0	7	6	8	21

=== Marshall ===
	1	2	3	4	Total
Thundering Herd	7	0	0	7	14
Monarchs	14	7	10	7	38

=== Southern Miss ===
	1	2	3	4	Total
Golden Eagles	0	7	14	14	35
Monarchs	21	14	7	9	51

=== At Florida Atlantic ===
	1	2	3	4	Total
Monarchs	3	10	22	7	42
Owls	14	7	3	0	24

=== FIU ===
	1	2	3	4	Total
Panthers	7	7	7	7	28
Monarchs	14	0	14	14	42

=== Bahamas Bowl–Eastern Michigan ===
	1	2	3	4	Total
Eagles	0	0	17	3	20
Monarchs	3	7	7	7	24
