= 2016 Florida Atlantic Owls football team =

American college football season

2016 Florida Atlantic Owls football
- Conference: Conference USA
- East Division
- Record: 3–9 (2–6 C-USA)
- Head coach: Charlie Partridge (3rd season)
- Offensive coordinator: Travis Trickett (1st season)
- Offensive scheme: Spread
- Defensive coordinator: Roc Bellantoni (3rd season)
- Base defense: 4–3
- Home stadium: FAU Stadium

2016 Conference USA football standings
| | Conf. | | | Overall |
| Team | W | | L | W | | L |
|---|---|---|---|---|---|---|
East Division
| Western Kentucky xy$ | 7 | – | 1 | 11 | – | 3 |
| Old Dominion x | 7 | – | 1 | 10 | – | 3 |
| Middle Tennessee | 5 | – | 3 | 8 | – | 5 |
| FIU | 4 | – | 4 | 4 | – | 8 |
| Charlotte | 3 | – | 5 | 4 | – | 8 |
| Marshall | 2 | – | 6 | 3 | – | 9 |
| Florida Atlantic | 2 | – | 6 | 3 | – | 9 |
West Division
| Louisiana Tech xy | 6 | – | 2 | 9 | – | 5 |
| UTSA | 5 | – | 3 | 6 | – | 7 |
| Southern Miss | 4 | – | 4 | 7 | – | 6 |
| North Texas | 3 | – | 5 | 5 | – | 8 |
| Rice | 2 | – | 6 | 3 | – | 9 |
| UTEP | 2 | – | 6 | 4 | – | 8 |
Championship: Western Kentucky 58, Louisiana Tech 44
$ – Conference champion; x – Division champion/co-champions; y – Championship game participant; Rankings from AP Poll

The 2016 Florida Atlantic Owls football team represented Florida Atlantic University in the 2016 NCAA Division I FBS football season. The Owls played their home games at the FAU Stadium in Boca Raton, Florida, and competed in the East Division of Conference USA (C–USA). They were led by third-year head coach Charlie Partridge. They finished the season 3–9, 2–6 in C-USA play to finish in a tie for sixth place in the East Division.

On November 27, head coach Charlie Partridge was fired. He finished at FAU with a three-year record of 9–27. On December 13, the school hired Lane Kiffin as head coach.

== Schedule ==
Florida Atlantic announced its 2016 football schedule on February 4, 2016. The 2016 schedule consists of 6 home and away games in the regular season. The Owls will host C–USA foes Charlotte, Old Dominion, UTEP, and Western Kentucky (WKU), and will travel to Florida International (FIU), Marshall, Middle Tennessee, and Rice.

The team will play four non–conference games, two home games against Ball State from the Mid-American Conference (MAC) and Southern Illinois from the Missouri Valley Football Conference, and two road games against Kansas State from the Big 12 Conference and Miami from the Atlantic Coast Conference.

| Date | Time | Opponent | Site | TV | Result | Attendance |
|---|---|---|---|---|---|---|
| September 3 | 6:00 p.m. | Southern Illinois* | FAU Stadium; Boca Raton, FL | CUSA.tv | W 38–30 | 14,887 |
| September 10 | 6:00 p.m. | at No. 25 Miami (FL)* | Hard Rock Stadium; Miami Gardens, FL | ACCN+ | L 10–38 | 57,123 |
| September 17 | 2:30 p.m. | at Kansas State* | Bill Snyder Family Football Stadium; Manhattan, KS | FSN | L 7–63 | 50,871 |
| September 24 | 6:00 p.m. | Ball State* | FAU Stadium; Boca Raton, FL | CUSA.tv | L 27–31 | 13,846 |
| October 1 | 7:00 p.m. | at FIU | FIU Stadium; Miami, FL (Shula Bowl) | beIN | L 31–33 | 16,164 |
| October 9^{[a]} | 12:00 p.m. | Charlotte | FAU Stadium; Boca Raton, FL | CUSA.tv | L 23–28 | 7,401 |
| October 15 | 7:00 p.m. | at Marshall | Joan C. Edwards Stadium; Huntington, WV | ASN | L 21–27 | 22,839 |
| October 29 | 3:30 p.m. | WKU | FAU Stadium; Boca Raton, FL | ASN | L 3–52 | 9,338 |
| November 5 | 3:30 p.m. | at Rice | Rice Stadium; Houston, TX | ESPN3 | W 42–25 | 19,892 |
| November 12 | 6:00 p.m. | UTEP | FAU Stadium; Boca Raton, FL | CUSA.tv | W 35–31 | 9,122 |
| November 19 | 6:00 p.m. | Old Dominion | FAU Stadium; Boca Raton, FL | CI | L 24–42 | 5,843 |
| November 26 | 5:30 p.m. | at Middle Tennessee | Johnny "Red" Floyd Stadium; Murfreesboro, TN | beIN | L 56–77 | 10,227 |
*Non-conference game; Rankings from AP Poll released prior to game; All times are in Eastern time

^{^[a]}The game between Florida Atlantic and Charlotte on October 8, 2016, has been postponed due to Hurricane Matthew. The game is tentatively rescheduled the following day on October 9, 2016 with a noon kickoff.
Schedule source:

== Game summaries ==
=== Southern Illinois ===
| | 1 | 2 | 3 | 4 | Total |
|---|---|---|---|---|---|
| Salukis | 14 | 10 | 0 | 6 | 30 |
| Owls | 14 | 7 | 14 | 3 | 38 |

=== At Miami (FL) ===
| | 1 | 2 | 3 | 4 | Total |
|---|---|---|---|---|---|
| Owls | 0 | 3 | 7 | 0 | 10 |
| #25 Hurricanes | 0 | 14 | 10 | 14 | 38 |

=== At Kansas State ===
| | 1 | 2 | 3 | 4 | Total |
|---|---|---|---|---|---|
| Owls | 0 | 0 | 0 | 7 | 7 |
| Wildcats | 21 | 21 | 7 | 14 | 63 |

=== Ball State ===
| | 1 | 2 | 3 | 4 | Total |
|---|---|---|---|---|---|
| Cardinals | 0 | 17 | 7 | 7 | 31 |
| Owls | 14 | 10 | 0 | 3 | 27 |

=== At FIU ===
| | 1 | 2 | 3 | 4 | Total |
|---|---|---|---|---|---|
| Owls | 7 | 10 | 14 | 0 | 31 |
| Panthers | 7 | 7 | 16 | 3 | 33 |

=== Charlotte ===
| | 1 | 2 | 3 | 4 | Total |
|---|---|---|---|---|---|
| 49ers | 7 | 14 | 7 | 0 | 28 |
| Owls | 3 | 14 | 0 | 6 | 23 |

=== At Marshall ===
| | 1 | 2 | 3 | 4 | Total |
|---|---|---|---|---|---|
| Owls | 14 | 7 | 0 | 0 | 21 |
| Thundering Herd | 10 | 6 | 3 | 8 | 27 |

=== WKU ===
| | 1 | 2 | 3 | 4 | Total |
|---|---|---|---|---|---|
| Hilltoppers | 14 | 10 | 14 | 14 | 52 |
| Owls | 0 | 3 | 0 | 0 | 3 |

=== At Rice ===
| | 1 | 2 | 3 | 4 | Total |
|---|---|---|---|---|---|
| FAU Owls | 14 | 7 | 7 | 14 | 42 |
| Rice Owls | 7 | 7 | 3 | 8 | 25 |

=== UTEP ===
| | 1 | 2 | 3 | 4 | Total |
|---|---|---|---|---|---|
| Miners | 7 | 10 | 7 | 7 | 31 |
| Owls | 7 | 10 | 3 | 15 | 35 |

=== Old Dominion ===
| | 1 | 2 | 3 | 4 | Total |
|---|---|---|---|---|---|
| Monarchs | 3 | 10 | 22 | 7 | 42 |
| Owls | 14 | 7 | 3 | 0 | 24 |

=== At Middle Tennessee ===
| | 1 | 2 | 3 | 4 | Total |
|---|---|---|---|---|---|
| Owls | 7 | 14 | 14 | 21 | 56 |
| Blue Raiders | 21 | 21 | 7 | 28 | 77 |
