= 2016 Marshall Thundering Herd football team =

American college football season

2016 Marshall Thundering Herd football
- Conference: Conference USA
- East Division
- Record: 3–9 (2–6 C-USA)
- Head coach: Doc Holliday (7th season)
- Offensive coordinator: Bill Legg (7th season)
- Offensive scheme: Spread
- Defensive coordinator: Chuck Heater (4th season)
- Base defense: 3–4
- Home stadium: Joan C. Edwards Stadium

2016 Conference USA football standings
	Conf.			Overall
Team	W		L	W		L
East Division
Western Kentucky xy$	7	–	1	11	–	3
Old Dominion x	7	–	1	10	–	3
Middle Tennessee	5	–	3	8	–	5
FIU	4	–	4	4	–	8
Charlotte	3	–	5	4	–	8
Marshall	2	–	6	3	–	9
Florida Atlantic	2	–	6	3	–	9
West Division
Louisiana Tech xy	6	–	2	9	–	5
UTSA	5	–	3	6	–	7
Southern Miss	4	–	4	7	–	6
North Texas	3	–	5	5	–	8
Rice	2	–	6	3	–	9
UTEP	2	–	6	4	–	8
Championship: Western Kentucky 58, Louisiana Tech 44
$ – Conference champion; x – Division champion/co-champions; y – Championship game participant; Rankings from AP Poll

The 2016 Marshall Thundering Herd football team represented Marshall University in the 2016 NCAA Division I FBS football season. The Thundering Herd played their home games at the Joan C. Edwards Stadium in Huntington, West Virginia, and competed in the East Division of Conference USA (C–USA). They were led by seventh-year head coach Doc Holliday. They finished the season 3–9, 2–6 in C-USA play to finish in a tie for sixth place in the East Division.

== Schedule ==
Marshall announced its 2016 football schedule on February 4, 2016. The 2016 schedule consisted of 7 home and 5 away games in the regular season. The Thundering Herd would host C–USA foes Charlotte, Florida Atlantic, Middle Tennessee, and Western Kentucky (WKU), and would travel to Florida International (FIU), North Texas, Old Dominion, and Southern Miss.

The team played four non–conference games, three home games against Akron from the Mid-American Conference (MAC), Louisville from the Atlantic Coast Conference (ACC), and Morgan State from the Mid-Eastern Athletic Conference, and traveled to Pittsburgh from the ACC.

Date	Time	Opponent	Site	TV	Result	Attendance
September 10	6:00 pm	Morgan State*	Joan C. Edwards Stadium; Huntington, WV	beIN	W 62–0	26,488
September 17	12:00 pm	Akron*	Joan C. Edwards Stadium; Huntington, WV	CBSSN	L 38–65	24,258
September 24	8:00 pm	No. 3 Louisville*	Joan C. Edwards Stadium; Huntington, WV	CBSSN	L 28–59	40,592
October 1	7:30 pm	at Pittsburgh*	Heinz Field; Pittsburgh, PA	ACCRSN; RTPT	L 27–43	45,246
October 8	7:00 pm	at North Texas	Apogee Stadium; Denton, TX	ASN	L 21–38	18,216
October 15	7:00 pm	Florida Atlantic^{†}	Joan C. Edwards Stadium; Huntington, WV	ASN	W 27–21	22,839
October 22	5:30 pm	Charlotte	Joan C. Edwards Stadium; Huntington, WV	beIN	L 24–27	20,904
October 29	7:00 pm	at Southern Miss	M. M. Roberts Stadium; Hattiesburg, MS	ASN	L 14–24	31,275
November 5	7:00 pm	at Old Dominion	Foreman Field; Norfolk, VA	ASN	L 14–38	20,118
November 12	7:00 pm	Middle Tennessee	Joan C. Edwards Stadium; Huntington, WV	ASN	W 42–17	20,841
November 19	7:00 pm	at FIU	FIU Stadium; Miami, FL	ASN	L 14–31	15,054
November 26	7:00 pm	WKU	Joan C. Edwards Stadium; Huntington, WV	ESPNU	L 6–60	17,397
*Non-conference game; ^{†}Homecoming; Rankings from AP Poll released prior to game; All times are in Eastern time

Schedule source:

== Game summaries ==
=== Morgan State ===
	1	2	3	4	Total
Bears	0	0	0	0	0
Thundering Herd	21	28	13	0	62

=== Akron ===
	1	2	3	4	Total
Zips	7	34	7	17	65
Thundering Herd	21	0	10	7	38

=== Louisville ===
	1	2	3	4	Total
#3 Cardinals	7	28	17	7	59
Thundering Herd	0	7	0	21	28

=== Pittsburgh ===
	1	2	3	4	Total
Thundering Herd	0	0	14	13	27
Panthers	20	7	3	13	43

=== North Texas ===
	1	2	3	4	Total
Thundering Herd	7	0	14	0	21
Mean Green	7	7	14	10	38

=== Florida Atlantic ===
	1	2	3	4	Total
Owls	14	7	0	0	21
Thundering Herd	10	6	3	8	27

=== Charlotte ===
	1	2	3	4	Total
49ers	10	7	3	7	27
Thundering Herd	14	10	0	0	24

=== Southern Miss ===
	1	2	3	4	Total
Thundering Herd	0	7	0	7	14
Golden Eagles	7	3	0	14	24

=== Old Dominion ===
	1	2	3	4	Total
Thundering Herd	7	0	0	7	14
Monarchs	14	7	10	7	38

=== Middle Tennessee ===
	1	2	3	4	Total
Blue Raiders	10	7	0	0	17
Thundering Herd	7	7	7	21	42

=== Florida International ===
	1	2	3	4	Total
Thundering Herd	7	0	0	7	14
Panthers	7	7	3	14	31

=== Western Kentucky ===
	1	2	3	4	Total
Hilltoppers	28	13	9	10	60
Thundering Herd	0	0	6	0	6
