= Charlie Partridge =

American football coach (born 1973)

Current position
- Title: Defensive line coach
- Team: Notre Dame
- Conference: Independent

Biographical details
- Born: December 7, 1973 (age 52)

Playing career
- 1992–1995: Drake
- Position: Defensive lineman

Coaching career (HC unless noted)
- 1996–1997: Drake (GA)
- 1998–1999: Iowa State (GA)
- 2002: Eastern Illinois (DL/LB)
- 2003–2005: Pittsburgh (DE)
- 2006: Pittsburgh (ST/DL)
- 2007: Pittsburgh (ST/LB)
- 2008–2010: Wisconsin (ST/DL)
- 2011–2012: Wisconsin (AHC/co-DC/DL)
- 2013: Arkansas (AHC/DL)
- 2014–2016: Florida Atlantic
- 2017: Pittsburgh (DL)
- 2018–2023: Pittsburgh (Co-DC/DL)
- 2024–2025: Indianapolis Colts (DL)
- 2026–present: Notre Dame (DL)

Administrative career (AD unless noted)
- 2000–2001: Iowa State (director of football operations)

Head coaching record
- Overall: 9–27

Charles James Partridge (born December 7, 1973) is an American football coach who is the defensive line coach of the Notre Dame Fighting Irish. He served as the head coach of the Florida Atlantic Owls from 2014 to 2016, and also coached for the Pittsburgh Panthers, Wisconsin Badgers, and Arkansas Razorbacks. He has also previously coached for the Indianapolis Colts of the National Football League (NFL).

== Playing career ==
A native of Plantation, Florida, Partridge attended Drake University, where he was a team captain of the football team. Later he also attended Iowa State University.

== Coaching career ==
Partridge's first coaching experience was as a graduate assistant with the Drake Bulldogs and the Iowa State Cyclones. From there he became the defensive line coach of the Eastern Illinois Panthers. Partridge served as defensive line coach, linebackers coach, and special teams coordinator of the Pitt Panthers for five seasons before joining the Wisconsin Badgers. He was named co-defensive coordinator at Wisconsin in January 2011. On December 15, 2012 the University of Arkansas announced the hiring of Partridge as the defensive line coach. Partridge was widely credited as Wisconsin's lead recruiter in the state of Florida, and helped land five-star running back Alex Collins for the Razorbacks in his first two months on the job. Partridge followed former Wisconsin Badgers head coach Bret Bielema to Arkansas.

Partridge was hired as the head coach at Florida Atlantic on December 16, 2013. He was fired on November 27, 2016. On February 14, 2017 Partridge was announced as the defensive line coach at Pittsburgh.

In February 2024, the Indianapolis Colts hired Partridge as their new defensive line coach on Shane Steichen's staff.

On January 3, 2026, Partridge left the Colts to take the same position with the University of Notre Dame, coaching the Defensive linemen.

== Personal life ==
Partridge is married to Julie and has two daughters, Alexa and Kylee.

== Head coaching record ==
Year	Team	Overall	Conference	Standing
Florida Atlantic (Conference USA) (2014–2016)
2014	Florida Atlantic	3–9	2–6	7th (East)
2015	Florida Atlantic	3–9	3–5	6th (East)
2016	Florida Atlantic	3–9	2–6	T–6th (East)
Florida Atlantic:		9–27	7–17	
Total:		9–27		
