= 2016 Middle Tennessee Blue Raiders football team =

American college football season

2016 Middle Tennessee Blue Raiders football

Hawaii Bowl, L 35–52 vs. Hawaii
- Conference: Conference USA
- East Division
- Record: 8–5 (5–3 C-USA)
- Head coach: Rick Stockstill (11th season)
- Offensive coordinator: Tony Franklin (1st season)
- Offensive scheme: Bear raid
- Defensive coordinator: Tyrone Nix (5th season)
- Base defense: 4–3
- Home stadium: Johnny "Red" Floyd Stadium

2016 Conference USA football standings
	Conf.			Overall
Team	W		L	W		L
East Division
Western Kentucky xy$	7	–	1	11	–	3
Old Dominion x	7	–	1	10	–	3
Middle Tennessee	5	–	3	8	–	5
FIU	4	–	4	4	–	8
Charlotte	3	–	5	4	–	8
Marshall	2	–	6	3	–	9
Florida Atlantic	2	–	6	3	–	9
West Division
Louisiana Tech xy	6	–	2	9	–	5
UTSA	5	–	3	6	–	7
Southern Miss	4	–	4	7	–	6
North Texas	3	–	5	5	–	8
Rice	2	–	6	3	–	9
UTEP	2	–	6	4	–	8
Championship: Western Kentucky 58, Louisiana Tech 44
$ – Conference champion; x – Division champion/co-champions; y – Championship game participant; Rankings from AP Poll

The 2016 Middle Tennessee Blue Raiders football team represented Middle Tennessee State University as a member of the East Division of Conference USA (C-USA) during the 2016 NCAA Division I FBS football season. Led by 11th-year head coach Rick Stockstill, the Blue Raiders compiled an overall record of 8–5 with a mark of 5–3 in conference play, placing third in the C-USA's East Division. Middle Tennessee was invited to the Hawaii Bowl, where they lost to Hawaii.. The team played home games at Johnny "Red" Floyd Stadium in Murfreesboro, Tennessee.

== Schedule ==
Middle Tennessee announced its 2016 football schedule on February 4, 2016. The 2016 schedule consisted of five home and seven away games in the regular season.

Date	Time	Opponent	Site	TV	Result	Attendance
September 3	6:00 pm	Alabama A&M*	Johnny "Red" Floyd Stadium; Murfreesboro, TN	CUSA.tv	W 55–0	19,967
September 10	3:00 pm	at Vanderbilt*	Vanderbilt Stadium; Nashville, TN	SECN Alt	L 24–47	29,627
September 17	11:00 am	at Bowling Green*	Doyt Perry Stadium; Bowling Green, OH	ESPN3	W 41–21	16,384
September 24	6:00 pm	Louisiana Tech	Johnny "Red" Floyd Stadium; Murfreesboro, TN	ASN	W 38–34	20,105
October 1	6:00 pm	at North Texas	Apogee Stadium; Denton, TX	CI	W 30–13	19,823
October 15	1:30 pm	WKU	Johnny "Red" Floyd Stadium; Murfreesboro, TN (100 Miles of Hate)	ESPN3	L 43–44 ^{2OT}	22,411
October 22	3:00 pm	at Missouri*	Faurot Field; Columbia, MO	SECN	W 51–45	52,351
October 29	6:00 pm	at FIU	FIU Stadium; Miami, FL	ESPN3	W 42–35	14,413
November 5	1:30 pm	UTSA	Johnny "Red" Floyd Stadium; Murfreesboro, TN	ESPN3	L 25–45	13,505
November 12	6:00 pm	at Marshall	Joan C. Edwards Stadium; Huntington, WV	ASN	L 17–42	20,841
November 19	1:00 pm	at Charlotte	Jerry Richardson Stadium; Charlotte, NC	ESPN3	W 38–31	13,433
November 26	4:30 pm	Florida Atlantic	Johnny "Red" Floyd Stadium; Murfreesboro, TN	beIN	W 77–56	10,227
December 24	7:00 pm	at Hawaii*	Aloha Stadium; Honolulu, HI (Hawaii Bowl)	ESPN	L 35–52	23,175
*Non-conference game; All times are in Central time

== Game summaries ==
=== Alabama A&M ===
	1	2	3	4	Total
Bulldogs	0	0	0	0	0
Blue Raiders	28	17	0	10	55

=== At Vanderbilt ===
	1	2	3	4	Total
Blue Raiders	10	7	7	0	24
Commodores	5	28	0	14	47

=== At Bowling Green ===
	1	2	3	4	Total
Blue Raiders	14	14	7	6	41
Falcons	14	7	0	0	21

=== Louisiana Tech ===
	1	2	3	4	Total
Bulldogs	7	13	7	7	34
Blue Raiders	7	0	10	21	38

=== At North Texas ===
	1	2	3	4	Total
Blue Raiders	0	13	7	10	30
Mean Green	7	0	0	6	13

=== WKU ===
	1	2	3	4	OT	2OT	Total
Hilltoppers	3	17	7	3	7	7	44
Blue Raiders	3	17	0	10	7	6	43

=== At Missouri ===
	1	2	3	4	Total
Blue Raiders	13	21	7	10	51
Tigers	14	14	7	10	45

=== At FIU ===
	1	2	3	4	Total
Blue Raiders	21	7	0	14	42
Panthers	14	7	0	14	35

=== UTSA ===
	1	2	3	4	Total
Roadrunners	14	14	14	3	45
Blue Raiders	7	3	7	8	25

=== At Marshall ===
	1	2	3	4	Total
Blue Raiders	10	7	0	0	17
Thundering Herd	7	7	7	21	42

=== At Charlotte ===
	1	2	3	4	Total
Blue Raiders	14	10	7	7	38
49ers	0	6	10	15	31

=== Florida Atlantic ===
	1	2	3	4	Total
Owls	7	14	14	21	56
Blue Raiders	21	21	7	28	77

=== vs Hawaii–Hawaii Bowl ===
	1	2	3	4	Total
Blue Raiders	14	7	7	7	35
Rainbow Warriors	14	21	10	7	52
