= 2016 Rice Owls football team =

American college football season

2016 Rice Owls football
- Conference: Conference USA
- West Division
- Record: 3–9 (2–6 C-USA)
- Head coach: David Bailiff (10th season)
- Offensive coordinator: Larry Edmondson (3rd season)
- Co-offensive coordinator: Billy Lynch (3rd season)
- Offensive scheme: Spread
- Defensive coordinator: Chris Thurmond (5th season)
- Base defense: 4–3
- Home stadium: Rice Stadium

2016 Conference USA football standings
	Conf.			Overall
Team	W		L	W		L
East Division
Western Kentucky xy$	7	–	1	11	–	3
Old Dominion x	7	–	1	10	–	3
Middle Tennessee	5	–	3	8	–	5
FIU	4	–	4	4	–	8
Charlotte	3	–	5	4	–	8
Marshall	2	–	6	3	–	9
Florida Atlantic	2	–	6	3	–	9
West Division
Louisiana Tech xy	6	–	2	9	–	5
UTSA	5	–	3	6	–	7
Southern Miss	4	–	4	7	–	6
North Texas	3	–	5	5	–	8
Rice	2	–	6	3	–	9
UTEP	2	–	6	4	–	8
Championship: Western Kentucky 58, Louisiana Tech 44
$ – Conference champion; x – Division champion/co-champions; y – Championship game participant; Rankings from AP Poll

The 2016 Rice Owls football team represented Rice University in the 2016 NCAA Division I FBS football season. The Owls played their home games at Rice Stadium in Houston, Texas, and competed in the West Division of Conference USA (C–USA). They were led by tenth year head coach David Bailiff. They finished the season 3–9, 2–6 in C-USA play to finish in a tie for fifth place in the East Division.

== Schedule ==
Rice announced its 2016 football schedule on February 4, 2016. The 2016 schedule consisted of 6 home and 6 away games in the regular season. The Owls hosted C–USA foes Florida Atlantic, North Texas, UTEP, and UTSA, and traveled to Charlotte, Louisiana Tech, Southern Miss, and Western Kentucky (WKU).

The team played four non–conference games, two home games against Baylor from the Big 12 Conference and Prairie View A&M from the Southwestern Athletic Conference, and two road games against Army, which was independent from a conference, and Stanford from the Pac-12 Conference.

Date	Time	Opponent	Site	TV	Result	Attendance
September 1	7:00 pm	at Western Kentucky	Houchens Industries–L. T. Smith Stadium; Bowling Green, KY	CBSSN	L 14–46	19,286
September 10	11:00 am	at Army*	Michie Stadium; West Point, NY	CBSSN	L 14–31	27,013
September 16	7:00 pm	No. 21 Baylor*	Rice Stadium; Houston, TX	ESPN	L 10–38	27,047
September 24	5:00 pm	North Texas	Rice Stadium; Houston, TX	CUSA.tv	L 35–42 ^{2OT}	20,792
October 1	6:00 pm	at Southern Miss	M. M. Roberts Stadium; Hattiesburg, MS	CI	L 28–44	28,325
October 15	6:00 pm	UTSA	Rice Stadium; Houston, TX	beIN	L 13–14	20,134
October 22	2:30 pm	Prairie View A&M*^{†}	Rice Stadium; Houston, TX	CUSA.tv	W 65–44	21,538
October 29	6:00 pm	at Louisiana Tech	Joe Aillet Stadium; Ruston, LA	CI	L 16–61	22,058
November 5	2:30 pm	Florida Atlantic	Rice Stadium; Houston, TX	ESPN3	L 25–42	19,892
November 12	1:00 pm	at Charlotte	Jerry Richardson Stadium; Charlotte, NC	CI	W 22–21	14,306
November 19	11:00 am	UTEP	Rice Stadium; Houston, TX	ESPN3	W 44–24	19,148
November 26	7:00 pm	at Stanford*	Stanford Stadium; Stanford, CA	P12N	L 17–41	36,171
*Non-conference game; ^{†}Homecoming; Rankings from AP Poll released prior to the game; All times are in Central time

== Game summaries ==
=== WKU ===
	1	2	3	4	Total
Owls	0	7	7	0	14
Hilltoppers	16	14	6	10	46

=== At Army ===
	1	2	3	4	Total
Owls	7	0	7	0	14
Black Knights	14	7	7	3	31

=== Baylor ===
	1	2	3	4	Total
#21 Bears	0	21	10	7	38
Owls	0	10	0	0	10

=== North Texas ===
	1	2	3	4	OT	2OT	Total
Mean Green	0	14	7	7	7	7	42
Owls	10	7	3	8	7	0	35

=== At Southern Miss ===
	1	2	3	4	Total
Owls	0	7	7	14	28
Golden Eagles	3	10	21	10	44

=== UTSA ===
	1	2	3	4	Total
Roadrunners	7	7	0	0	14
Owls	6	0	7	0	13

=== Prairie View A&M ===
	1	2	3	4	Total
Panthers	7	7	16	14	44
Owls	14	31	13	7	65

=== At Louisiana Tech ===
	1	2	3	4	Total
Owls	0	0	9	7	16
Bulldogs	28	13	13	7	61

=== Florida Atlantic ===
	1	2	3	4	Total
FAU Owls	14	7	7	14	42
Rice Owls	7	7	3	8	25

=== At Charlotte ===
	1	2	3	4	Total
Owls	0	10	6	6	22
49ers	7	14	0	0	21

=== UTEP ===
	1	2	3	4	Total
Miners	3	0	7	14	24
Owls	6	28	7	3	44

=== At Stanford ===
	1	2	3	4	Total
Owls	0	3	7	7	17
Cardinal	13	7	21	0	41
