= Kevin Donnalley =

American football player and coach (born 1968)

No. 77, 65
- Positions: Guard, tackle

Personal information
- Born: June 10, 1968 (age 58); St. Louis, Missouri, U.S.
- Listed height: 6 ft 5 in (1.96 m)
- Listed weight: 310 lb (141 kg)

Career information
- High school: Athens Drive (Raleigh, North Carolina)
- College: North Carolina
- NFL draft: 1991: 3rd round, 79th overall pick

Career history
- Houston/Tennessee Oilers (1991–1997); Miami Dolphins (1998–2000); Carolina Panthers (2001–2003)

Awards and highlights
- Second-team All-ACC (1990)

Career NFL statistics
- Games played: 193
- Games started: 144
- Fumble recoveries: 3
- Stats at Pro Football Reference

Kevin Thomas Donnalley (born June 10, 1968) is an American football coach and former player. He played professionally as a guard in the National Football League (NFL) for the Houston/Tennessee Oilers, Miami Dolphins, and Carolina Panthers. He is currently the Director of the Koman Game Plan for Success, a position that focuses on athlete development, for his alma mater, North Carolina.

== Playing career ==
Donnalley played high school football at Athens Drive High School, from which he graduated in 1986. He played college football at Davidson College for his two years before transferring to the University of North Carolina at Chapel Hill to finish his college career.

Donnalley was drafted by the Houston Oilers in the third round of the 1991 NFL Draft with the 79th overall pick. Donnalley was a member of the Houston/Tennessee Oilers from 1991 to 1997, a member of the Miami Dolphins from 1998 to 2000, and a member of the Carolina Panthers from 2001 to 2003.

Donnalley was part of the offensive line for the Carolina Panthers in 2003. He anchored the Panthers offensive line that allowed only 26 sacks in 2003, a team record for fewest sacks allowed in a season, and helped Panthers rush for a team-record 2,091 yards, including a team-individual mark of 1,444 yards by Stephen Davis.

== Coaching career ==
When the Charlotte 49ers football team restarted their football program in 2013, Donnalley was working in strength and conditioning initially with the plan to move to player development. But in August 2015, the program experienced an unexpected loss when offensive line coach, Phil Ratliff, passed away and Donnalley stepped in to replace him for the season.

Once the season ended, a new offensive line coach was hired and Donnalley was finally able to move to player development. From 2016 to 2020, Donnalley was the director of student-athlete development for the Charlotte 49ers football team.

On March 23, 2020, he was named director of high school relations for the North Carolina Tar Heels. In 2022, Donnalley was named Director of the Koman Game Plan for Success. His new position focuses on student-athlete development away from football and Donnalley coordinates "initiatives in leadership, career development, and community service. An alumnus of the University of North Carolina at Chapel Hill, Donnalley served under his former coach, Mack Brown.

== Personal life ==
Donnalley and his wife, Erica, also a North Carolina alumnus, have three children: Kayla, Thomas, and Matthew.

He is the younger brother of former NFL player and fellow UNC alum Rick Donnalley.

Heavily involved in charity work, Donnalley served on the national advisory board for the Make a Wish Foundation for seven years as well as helping found another charity March Forth With Hope Foundation that supports families with children battling life-threatening medical conditions.

He appeared on the television show Fluffy's Food Adventures season 2 episode 7. Comedian Gabriel Iglesias visits Charlotte and then Carolina Panthers coach Ron Rivera.
