= Middle Tennessee Blue Raiders football statistical leaders =

The Middle Tennessee Blue Raiders football statistical leaders are individual statistical leaders of the Middle Tennessee Blue Raiders football program in various categories, including passing, rushing, receiving, total offense, defensive stats, and kicking. Within those areas, the lists identify single-game, single-season, and career leaders. The Blue Raiders represent Middle Tennessee State University in the NCAA's Conference USA.

Although Middle Tennessee began competing in intercollegiate football in 1911, the school's official record book considers the "modern era" to have begun in 1949. Records from before this year are often incomplete and inconsistent, and they are generally not included in these lists.

These lists are dominated by more recent players for several reasons:

- Since 1949, seasons have increased from 10 games to 11 and then 12 games in length.
- The NCAA didn't allow freshmen to play varsity football until 1972 (with the exception of the World War II years), allowing players to have four-year careers.
- Bowl games only began counting toward single-season and career statistics in 2002. The Blue Raiders have played in ten bowl games since then, most recently the 2022 Hawaii Bowl, giving many recent players an extra game to accumulate statistics.
- In addition, the Blue Raiders played in the 2018 C-USA Championship Game, providing yet another game for players in that season.

These lists are updated through the 2025 season.

== Passing ==
=== Passing yards ===
Career
Rk	Player	Yards	Years
1	Brent Stockstill	12,165	2014 2015 2016 2017 2018
2	Nicholas Vattiato	9,674	2021 2022 2023 2024 2025
3	Wes Counts	8,007	1998 1999 2000 2001
4	Logan Kilgore	7,849	2010 2011 2012 2013
5	Clint Marks	7,342	2003 2004 2005 2006
6	Kelly Holcomb	7,064	1991 1992 1993 1994
7	Dwight Dasher	5,643	2007 2008 2009 2010
8	Jonathan Quinn	4,864	1995 1996 1997
9	Teddy Morris	4,799	1962 1963 1964 1965
10	Chase Cunningham	4,768	2018 2019 2020 2021 2022

Single season
Rk	Player	Yards	Year
1	Brent Stockstill	4,005	2015
2	Brent Stockstill	3,544	2018
3	Brent Stockstill	3,233	2016
4	Chase Cunningham	3,156	2022
5	Nicholas Vattiato	3,092	2023
	Nicholas Vattiato	3,092	2024
7	Dwight Dasher	2,789	2009
8	Clint Marks	2,749	2004
9	Joe Craddock	2,677	2008
10	Asher O'Hara	2,616	2019

Single game
Rk	Player	Yards	Year	Opponent
1	Wes Counts	459	2001	Idaho
2	Nicholas Vattiato	456	2024	Western Kentucky
3	Chase Cunningham	448	2022	Florida Atlantic
4	Clint Marks	447	2004	Arkansas State
5	Brent Stockstill	434	2016	Western Kentucky
6	Brent Stockstill	432	2016	Hawaiʻi (Hawaiʻi Bowl)
7	Logan Kilgore	415	2011	Troy
8	Chase Cunningham	408	2022	Miami
	Nicholas Vattiato	408	2023	Jacksonville State
10	Brent Stockstill	407	2018	UT-Martin

=== Passing touchdowns ===
Career
Rk	Player	TDs	Years
1	Brent Stockstill	106	2014 2015 2016 2017 2018
2	Nicholas Vattiato	62	2021 2022 2023 2024 2025
3	Logan Kilgore	53	2010 2011 2012 2013
4	Wes Counts	50	1998 1999 2000 2001
5	Teddy Morris	41	1962 1963 1964 1965
6	Dwight Dasher	40	2007 2008 2009 2010
7	Chase Cunningham	39	2018 2019 2020 2021 2022
8	Clint Marks	37	2003 2004 2005 2006
9	Kelly Holcomb	36	1991 1992 1993 1994
10	Mickey Corwin	33	1983 1984

Single season
Rk	Player	TDs	Year
1	Brent Stockstill	31	2016
2	Brent Stockstill	30	2015
3	Brent Stockstill	29	2018
4	Dwight Dasher	23	2009
	Nicholas Vattiato	23	2023
6	Mickey Corwin	21	1984
	Chase Cunningham	21	2022
8	Asher O'Hara	20	2019
9	Logan Kilgore	18	2011
10	Wes Counts	17	2001
	Austin Grammer	17	2014

Single game
Rk	Player	TDs	Year	Opponent
1	Wes Counts	6	2001	Idaho
2	Billy Walker	5	1967	UT Martin
	Logan Kilgore	5	2011	Troy
	Brent Stockstill	5	2015	Charlotte
	Brent Stockstill	5	2016	Alabama A&M
	Brent Stockstill	5	2018	UT Martin
	Chase Cunningham	5	2021	Charlotte
	Chase Cunningham	5	2022	Florida Atlantic

== Rushing ==
=== Rushing yards ===
Career
Rk	Player	Yards	Years
1	Joe Campbell	3,823	1988 1989 1990 1991
2	Mike Moore	3,678	1974 1975 1976 1977
3	Dwone Hicks	3,613	1999 2000 2001 2002
4	Kippy Bayless	3,286	1991 1992 1993 1994
5	Vince Hall	3,075	1981 1982 1983 1984
6	Gerald Anderson	2,862	1984 1985 1986 1987
7	Eugene Gross	2,753	2003 2004 2005 2006
8	Jordan Parker	2,611	2012 2013 2014 2015
9	Bobby Young	2,524	1951 1952 1953
10	Dwight Dasher	2,419	2007 2008 2009 2010

Single season
Rk	Player	Yards	Year
1	I'Tavius Mathers	1,561	2016
2	Vince Hall	1,439	1984
3	Kippy Bayless	1,346	1994
4	Dwone Hicks	1,277	2000
5	Mike Moore	1,247	1975
6	Kippy Bayless	1,214	1993
7	Mike Moore	1,188	1976
8	Dwight Dasher	1,154	2009
9	Dwone Hicks	1,143	2001
10	Joe Campbell	1,136	1990

Single game
Rk	Player	Yards	Year	Opponent
1	Dwone Hicks	311	2000	Louisiana Tech
2	Kelverrick Green	259	1998	UT-Martin
3	Torin Kirtsey	251	1998	Tennessee State
4	Vince Hall	250	1984	Morehead State
5	Walter Dunson	244	1992	UT-Martin
6	Joe Campbell	235	1990	Morehead State
7	Benny Cunningham	230	2012	Florida International
8	Ricky Martin	229	1990	Murray State
9	Vince Hall	223	1984	Indiana State
10	Mike Moore	219	1976	East Tennessee State

=== Rushing touchdowns ===
Career
Rk	Player	TDs	Years
1	Dwone Hicks	53	1999 2000 2001 2002
2	Joe Campbell	44	1988 1989 1990 1991
3	Eugene Gross	41	2003 2004 2005 2006
4	Kippy Bayless	38	1991 1992 1993 1994
5	Phillip Tanner	33	2006 2007 2008 2009 2010
6	Gerald Anderson	27	1984 1985 1986 1987
	Walter Dunson	27	1990 1991 1992
8	Dwight Stone	26	1985 1986
	Brigham Lyons	26	1992 1993 1994 1995
10	Mike Moore	24	1974 1975 1976 1977
	Dwight Dasher	24	2007 2008 2009 2010

Single season
Rk	Player	TDs	Year
1	Dwone Hicks	20	2001
2	Dwone Hicks	19	2000
3	I'Tavius Mathers	17	2016
4	Kippy Bayless	15	1993
	Kippy Bayless	15	1994
	Phillip Tanner	15	2008
7	Joe Campbell	14	1991

Single game
Rk	Player	TDs	Year	Opponent
1	Dwone Hicks	6	2000	Louisiana Tech
2	Phillip Tanner	5	2008	North Texas
	Benny Cunningham	5	2012	Georgia Tech

== Receiving ==
=== Receptions ===
Career
Rk	Player	Rec	Years
1	Ty Lee	260	2016 2017 2018 2019
2	Richie James	243	2015 2016 2017
3	Kendall Newson	238	1998 1999 2000 2001
4	Tyrone Calico	194	1999 2000 2001 2002
5	Kerry Wright	167	2001 2002 2003 2004
6	Yusuf Ali	152	2019 2020 2021 2022
7	Jarrin Pierce	144	2019 2020 2021
8	Tavarres Jefferson	131	2009 2010 2011 2012
9	Ed Batties	127	2014 2015
10	Jaylin Lane	124	2020 2021 2022

Single season
Rk	Player	Rec	Year
1	Richie James	108	2015
2	Richie James	105	2016
3	Ed Batties	82	2015
4	Ty Lee	79	2017
5	Kerry Wright	76	2004
6	Kendall Newson	74	2000
7	Kerry Wright	73	2003
8	Anthony Amos	72	2012
9	Ty Lee	71	2018
10	Kendall Newson	69	1999
	Jaylin Lane	69	2022

Single game
Rk	Player	Rec	Year	Opponent
1	Richie James	16	2016	Western Kentucky
2	Richie James	16	2016	Vanderbilt
3	Ed Batties	13	2015	Illinois
4	Tyrone Calico	12	1999	East Tennessee State
	Kendall Newson	12	2001	New Mexico State
	Richie James	12	2015	Illinois
	Richie James	12	2016	Marshall
8	Jerry Smith	11	1965	East Tennessee State
	Dennis Mimms	11	1993	Eastern Kentucky
	Kendall Newson	11	1999	Wofford
	Cleannord Saintil	11	2005	Louisiana-Monroe
	Patrick Honeycutt	11	2008	Arkansas State
	Eldred King	11	2008	Mississippi State
	Jarrin Pierce	11	2020	Troy
	Izaiah Gathings	11	2022	Colorado State
	Elijah Metcalf	11	2023	Colorado State

=== Receiving yards ===
Career
Rk	Player	Yards	Years
1	Richie James	3,261	2015 2016 2017
2	Kendall Newson	3,074	1998 1999 2000 2001
3	Ty Lee	3,062	2016 2017 2018 2019
4	Tyrone Calico	2,636	1999 2000 2001 2002
5	Kerry Wright	2,589	2001 2002 2003 2004
6	Demetric Mostiller	2,205	1993 1994 1995 1996
7	Herbert Owenby	1,757	1964 1965 1966 1967
8	Jarrin Pierce	1,669	2019 2020 2021
9	Holden Willis	1,568	2023 2024
10	Vince Parks	1,558	1988 1989 1990 1991 1992

Single season
Rk	Player	Yards	Year
1	Richie James	1,625	2016
2	Richie James	1,346	2015
3	Kerry Wright	1,280	2003
4	Ed Batties	1,048	2015
	Kerry Wright	1,048	2004
6	Anthony Amos	992	2012
7	Ty Lee	955	2017
8	Kendall Newson	945	2000
9	Jaylin Lane	940	2022
10	Demetric Mostiller	934	1995

Single game
Rk	Player	Yards	Year	Opponent
1	Demetric Mostiller	244	1995	UT Martin
2	Omari Kelly	239	2024	Western Kentucky
3	Richie James	223	2016	Western Kentucky
4	Demetric Mostiller	209	1996	Southeast Missouri State
5	Richie James	198	2015	Florida Atlantic
6	Kerry Wright	187	2003	New Mexico State
7	Richie James	183	2016	Vanderbilt
8	Kendall Newson	181	2001	New Mexico State
9	Kendall Newson	180	2000	Mississippi State
10	Jaylin Lane	179	2022	UTSA

=== Receiving touchdowns ===
Career
Rk	Player	TDs	Years
1	Ty Lee	24	2016 2017 2018 2019
2	Richie James	23	2015 2016 2017
3	Kerry Wright	22	2001 2002 2003 2004
4	Kendall Newson	21	1998 1999 2000 2001
5	Herbert Owenby	21	1964 1965 1966 1967
6	Demetric Mostiller	18	1993 1994 1995 1996
7	Tyrone Calico	17	1999 2000 2001 2002
8	Ed Batties	16	2014 2015
	George Dykes	16	1961 1962 1963
	G. E. McCormack	16	1955 1956 1957 1958

Single season
Rk	Player	TDs	Year
1	Ed Batties	13	2015
2	Richie James	12	2016
3	Kerry Wright	11	2004
4	Kerry Wright	9	2003
	Anthony Amos	9	2012
	Ty Lee	9	2016
7	Jerry Smith	8	1965
	Cory Simpson	8	1994
	Richie James	8	2015
	Dennis Andrews	8	2016

Single game
Rk	Player	TDs	Year	Opponent
1	Herbert Owenby	3	1967	Tennessee Tech
	Donte Lofton	3	1984	Lenoir-Rhyne
	Vince Parks	3	1990	UT-Chattanooga
	Cory Simpson	3	1994	Morehead State
	Demetric Mostiller	3	1995	Georgia Southern
	Tyrone Calico	3	2001	Idaho
	Tyrone Calico	3	2002	Louisiana-Monroe
	Kerry Wright	3	2003	New Mexico State
	Kerry Wright	3	2004	Arkansas State
	Ed Batties	3	2015	Charlotte
	Patrick Smith	3	2018	UT-Martin
	Omari Kelly	3	2024	Western Kentucky

== Total offense ==
Total offense is the sum of passing and rushing statistics. It does not include receiving or returns.

=== Total offense yards ===
Career
Rk	Player	Yards	Years
1	Brent Stockstill	12,628	2014 2015 2016 2017 2018
2	Nicholas Vattiato	10,208	2021 2022 2023 2024 2025
3	Wes Counts	8,181	1998 1999 2000 2001
4	Dwight Dasher	8,062	2007 2008 2009 2010
5	Logan Kilgore	8,059	2010 2011 2012 2013
6	Clint Marks	7,235	2003 2004 2005 2006
7	Kelly Holcomb	6,998	1991 1992 1993 1994
8	Asher O'Hara	6,420	2018 2019 2020
9	Marvin Collier	5,886	1985 1986 1987 1988
10	Teddy Morris	5,566	1962 1963 1964 1965

Single season
Rk	Player	Yards	Year
1	Brent Stockstill	4,042	2015
2	Dwight Dasher	3,943	2009
3	Asher O'Hara	3,660	2019
4	Nicholas Vattiato	3,489	2023
5	Brent Stockstill	3,473	2016
6	Brent Stockstill	3,363	2018
7	Chase Cunningham	3,208	2022
8	Nicholas Vattiato	3,169	2024
9	Austin Grammer	2,999	2014
10	Clint Marks	2,862	2004

Single game
Rk	Player	Yards	Year	Opponent
1	Nicholas Vattiato	477	2024	Western Kentucky
2	Joe Craddock	471	2007	Louisiana-Monroe
	Roman Gagliano	471	2025	Western Kentucky
4	Clint Marks	461	2004	Arkansas State
5	Chase Cunningham	458	2022	Florida Atlantic
6	Brent Stockstill	452	2016	Western Kentucky
7	Wes Counts	451	2001	Idaho
8	Chase Cunningham	444	2021	Charlotte
9	Brent Stockstill	440	2016	Hawaiʻi (Hawaiʻi Bowl)
10	Chase Cunningham	437	2022	Miami

=== Total touchdowns ===
Career
Rk	Player	TDs	Years
1	Brent Stockstill	109	2014 2015 2016 2017 2018
2	Nicholas Vattiato	67	2021 2022 2023 2024 2025
3	Dwight Dasher	64	2007 2008 2009 2010
4	Wes Counts	61	1998 1999 2000 2001
5	Logan Kilgore	57	2010 2011 2012 2013
6	Teddy Morris	56	1962 1963 1964 1965
7	Dwone Hicks	53	1999 2000 2001 2002

Single season
Rk	Player	TDs	Year
1	Dwight Dasher	36	2009
2	Brent Stockstill	32	2015
3	Brent Stockstill	31	2016
4	Brent Stockstill	30	2018
5	Asher O'Hara	29	2019
6	Chase Cunningham	27	2022
7	Nicholas Vattiato	25	2023
8	Teddy Morris	24	1965
9	Austin Grammer	23	2014

== Defense ==
=== Interceptions ===
Career
Rk	Player	Ints	Years
1	Kevin Byard	19	2012 2013 2014 2015
2	James Griffin	17	1979 1980 1981 1982
3	Bradley Robinson	14	2004 2005 2006 2007
4	Cedric Stegall	14	1995 1996 1997 1998
5	Ray Oldham	13	1969 1970 1971 1972
	Don Griffin	13	1982 1983 1984 1985
7	Jimbo Pearson	11	1960 1961 1963 1964

Single season
Rk	Player	Ints	Year
1	James Griffin	8	1982
2	Marcus Udell	7	2009
	Decorian Patterson	7	2022
4	Jimbo Pearson	6	1960
	Mike Matheny	6	1967
	Don Griffin	6	1985
	Tommy Barnes	6	1988
	Jimmy McCamey	6	1989
	Kevin Byard	6	2014
	Wesley Bush	6	2018

Single game
Rk	Player	Ints	Year	Opponent
1	Damon Nickson	4	2006	Louisiana-Lafayette
2	Mike Matheny	3	1967	Pensacola Navy
	Ken Coffee	3	1969	Austin Peay
	Don Griffin	3	1985	Akron

=== Tackles ===
Career
Rk	Player	Tackles	Years
1	Reed Blankenship	419	2017 2018 2019 2020 2021
2	Roosevelt Colvard	344	1983 1984 1985 1986
3	Stan Wright	331	1976 1977 1978 1979
4	Robbie Ridings	331	1979 1980 1981 1982
5	T. T. Barber	323	2012 2013 2014 2015
6	Dennis Mix	313	1979 1980 1981 1982
	Jovante Moffatt	313	2015 2016 2017 2018 2019
8	Kevin Byard	312	2012 2013 2014 2015
9	Melvin Boyd	303	1973 1974 1975
10	DQ Thomas	299	2018 2019 2020 2021

Single season
Rk	Player	Tackles	Year
1	Stan Wright	178	1978
2	Gary Bell	142	1973
	Melvin Boyd	142	1974
4	Chris Keen	140	1975
5	Mo Bell	132	1977
6	Roosevelt Colvard	125	1985
7	John Csir	125	1975
8	Andra Bullock	120	1977
	Roosevelt Colvard	120	1986
10	T. T. Barber	119	2013

Single game
Rk	Player	Tackles	Year	Opponent
1	Chris Keen	24	1975	Western Kentucky
2	Robbie Ridings	23	1991	Murray State
3	Andra Bullock	22	1977	Western Kentucky
	Jimmy Roberto	22	1981	Murray State
5	Chris Keen	21	1975	Morehead State
	Scotty Brown	21	1998	Southeast Missouri State
7	John Csir	20	1975	Morehead State
	Scott Boykin	20	1991	Eastern Kentucky
	Nathaniel Claybrooks	20	1994	Marshall
	Darrell Love	20	1996	Eastern Illinois

=== Sacks ===
Career
Rk	Player	Sacks	Years
1	Erik Walden	22.5	2004 2005 2006 2007
2	Leighton Gasque	22.0	2011 2012 2013 2014
3	Jordan Ferguson	21.5	2017 2018 2020 2021 2022
4	Jamari Lattimore	20.5	2008 2009 2010
5	DQ Thomas	18.5	2018 2019 2020 2021
6	Khalil Brooks	17.0	2015 2016 2017 2018 2019
7	Anthony McCord	15.0	1993 1994 1995 1996
8	Tavares Jones	14.0	2004 2005 2006 2007
9	Danny Carmichael	12.5	2006 2007 2008 2009
10	Devarick Scandrett	12.0	2002 2003 2004 2005

Single season
Rk	Player	Sacks	Year
1	Erik Walden	11.5	2006
	Jamari Lattimore	11.5	2010
3	Jordan Ferguson	9.0	2021
4	Jordan Ferguson	8.5	2022
5	DQ Thomas	8.0	2018
6	Khalil Brooks	7.5	2017
7	Anthony Hicks	7.0	1996
	Tavares Jones	7.0	2007
	Chris McCoy	7.0	2009
	Leighton Gasque	7.0	2011

Single game
Rk	Player	Sacks	Year	Opponent
1	Jamari Lattimore	4.0	2010	Louisiana-Lafayette
2	Anthony Hicks	3.0	1996	UT Martin
	Jamari Lattimore	3.0	2009	Maryland
	Dearco Nolan	3.0	2013	Florida Atlantic
	Khalil Brooks	3.0	2017	FIU
6	Kenny McDaniel	2.5	1985	Akron
	Erik Walden	2.5	2006	Troy
	Shubert Bastien	2.5	2014	Old Dominion
	Khalil Brooks	2.5	2018	UAB
	Jordan Ferguson	2.5	2021	Southern Miss
	Quindarius Dunnigan	2.5	2022	Colorado State

== Kicking ==
=== Field goals made ===
Career
Rk	Player	FGs	Years
1	Kelly Potter	52	1981 1982 1983 1984
2	Alan Gendreau	46	2008 2009 2010 2011
3	Zeke Rankin	45	2021 2022 2023 2024
4	Brian Kelly	40	2000 2001 2002 2003
5	Garth Petrilli	38	1991 1992 1993 1994
6	Crews Holt	37	2017 2018 2019 2020
7	Joe Lisle	35	1987 1988 1989
	Keegan Ray	35	1996 1997 1998 1999
9	Cody Clark	33	2012 2013 2014 2015
10	Colby Smith	30	2003 2004 2005 2006
	Canon Rooker	30	2013 2015 2016 2017

Single season
Rk	Player	FGs	Year
1	Alan Gendreau	18	2009
	Crews Holt	18	2018
3	Matt Crews	17	1990
	Carlos Lopez	17	2012
5	Canon Rooker	16	2016
	Zeke Rankin	16	2022
7	Colby Smith	15	2004
8	Kelly Potter	14	1984
	Joe Lisle	14	1989

Single game
Rk	Player	FGs	Year	Opponent
1	Matt Crews	5	1990	Tennessee Tech
	Crews Holt	5	2018	Western Kentucky
3	Joe Lisle	4	1988	Georgia Southern
	Garth Petrilli	4	1993	Tennessee State
	Crews Holt	4	2018	UAB (C-USA Championship Game)
	Kyle Ulbrich	4	2022	San Diego State
	Dominic Bourgeois	4	2026	Florida International

=== Field goal percentage ===
Career
Rk	Player	FG%	Years
1	Canon Rooker	83.3%	2013 2015 2016 2017
2	Jacob Hathaway	78.6%	2025
3	Brian Kelly	78.4%	2000 2001 2002 2003
4	Zeke Rankin	76.3%	2021 2022 2023 2024
5	Alan Gendreau	74.2%	2008 2009 2010 2011
6	Crews Holt	71.2%	2017 2018 2019 2020
7	Cody Clark	70.2%	2012 2013 2014 2015
8	Joe Lisle	67.3%	1987 1988 1989
9	Kelly Potter	66.7%	1981 1982 1983 1984
10	Colby Smith	65.2%	2003 2004 2005 2006

Single season
Rk	Player	FG%	Year
1	Colby Smith	88.2%	2004
2	Kelly Potter	86.7%	1981
3	Brian Kelly	84.6%	2000
4	Canon Rooker	84.2%	2016
	Zeke Rankin	84.2%	2022
6	Alan Gendreau	83.3%	2010
7	Joe Lisle	82.4%	1989
	Canon Rooker	82.4%	2017
9	Alan Gendreau	81.8%	2009
10	Brian Kelly	81.3%	2003
