= List of Middle Tennessee State University people =

This is a list of notable alumni and distinguished faculty at Middle Tennessee State University.

== Athletics ==
- Reed Blankenship (2022) – current National Football League defensive back
- Dewon Brazelton – Major League Baseball pitcher
- Tony Burse (1986) – former National Football League running back
- Kevin Byard (2015) – 2017 All Pro Safety National Football League defensive back
- Mike Caldwell (1993) – former National Football League linebacker
- Tyrone Calico (2002) – former National Football League wide receiver
- Marty Carter (1991) – former National Football League safety
- Alysha Clark (2010) – American-Israeli basketball player for the Israeli team Elitzur Ramla and the Las Vegas Aces of the Women's National Basketball Association (WNBA); forward
- Jerry DeLucca (1956) – former National Football League offensive tackle
- Don Griffin (1986) – former National Football League safety
- James Griffin (1983) – former National Football League safety
- Dwone Hicks (2003) – former National Football League running back
- Andrico Hines (2003) – Arena Football League player
- Kelly Holcomb (1995) – former National Football League quarterback
- Amber Holt (2008) – Women's National Basketball Association forward
- Richie James (2017) – National Football League wide receiver
- Shawn Jones (2014) – basketball player for Hapoel Haifa of the Israeli Basketball Premier League
- Jeremy Kellem (2010) – Arena Football League defensive back
- ReShard Lee (2003) – National Football League running back
- David Little (1984) – former National Football League tight end
- Mike Moore (1978) – Houston Oilers Chattanooga Sports Hall of Fame
- Kendall Newson (2001) – former National Football League wide receiver
- Ray Oldham (1973) – former National Football League safety
- Jayhawk Owens – former Major League Baseball catcher
- Shane Primm – UFC contestant on The Ultimate Fighter Season 8, light-heavyweight fighter
- Jonathan Quinn (1998) – former National Football League quarterback
- Mardy Scales (2003) – United States sprinter
- Dwight Stone (1986) – former National Football League wide receiver
- Phillip Tanner (2010) – former National Football League running back
- Kenny Tippins (1989) – former National Football League linebacker
- Ken Trickey (1955) – college basketball coach
- Reggie Upshaw (2017) – basketball player in the Israel Basketball Premier League
- Erik Walden (2008) – National Football League linebacker
- Josh Walker – National Football League guard

== Musicians ==
- Julien Baker – singer, songwriter, and guitarist
- Brooke Barrettsmith – Billboard-charting singer, songwriter, guitarist, and pianist
- Scott "Skippy" Chapman (2001) – keyboardist and singer-songwriter, Code of Ethics
- George S. Clinton (1969) – Hollywood composer (Austin Powers trilogy)
- Count Bass D – rapper, producer
- Cedric Dent – gospel music singer, member of Take 6, professor of Theory & Composition in the MTSU School of Music
- Colton Dixon (2010) – American Idol Season 11 contestant, top 7
- Brett Eldredge – singer-songwriter, guitarist
- Bobby Bosko Grubic (a.k.a. Bobby G) (1999) – singer-songwriter, director/producer
- Hardy (Michael Wilson Hardy) – country music singer-songwriter
- Chris James – singer-songwriter, producer and Grammy Award-nominated engineer for Prince; member of Self
- Tay Keith – producer
- Lecrae – rapper
- Amy Lee (2000/dropped out) – co-founder and lead singer, Evanescence
- Brice Long (1993) – country music singer-songwriter
- Matt Mahaffey (1993/dropped out) – singer-songwriter, film scorer, lead member of Self
- Sean McConnell – singer-songwriter
- Natalie Prass – singer-songwriter
- The Protomen – independent concept band based in Nashville
- Isaiah Rashad – rapper
- Jeremi Richardson – singer, member of the CCM group Avalon
- Laura Rogers – of the Americana music duo The Secret Sisters
- Hillary Scott (2006) – singer-songwriter, Lady A
- Street Symphony (Torrance Esmond)– producer; 57th Annual Grammy Award for Best Contemporary Christian Music Performance/Song
- Sharon Van Etten – singer-songwriter
- Chris Young – country music singer; 2006 winner, Nashville Star
- Medium Build – American singer-songwriter
- Dave Barnes – American singer-songwriter

== Nobel Prize laureates ==
- James M. Buchanan, B.A. (1940) – 1986 Nobel Prize in Economics laureate
- Muhammad Yunus – 2006 Nobel Peace Prize laureate, professor of economics (1969–1972)

== Politicians ==
- Bill Boner (1967) – mayor of Nashville, Tennessee (1987–1991) and U.S. representative (Democrat – 5th District Tennessee – 1979–1987)
- Raleigh Brown – politician and judge in Texas
- Bart Gordon (1971) – U.S. representative (Democrat – 6th District Tennessee – 1985–2011)
- Albert Gore, Sr. (1932) – U.S. senator (Democrat – Tennessee – 1953–1971)
- Andy Ogles (2007) – mayor of Maury County, Tennessee (2018–2022) and U.S. representative (Republican – 5th District Tennessee – 2023–present)
- Robert Rochelle (1968) – Tennessee state senator, 1970–2002

== Others ==
- Gordon Anderson – sculptor
- Victoria Eady Butler - retired law enforcement officer, Master blender of Uncle Nearest Premium Whiskey, first Black woman to be a master blender, and first person to win Master Blender of the Year twice in a row.
- Bryan M. Clayton – businessman and real estate investor, CEO and co-founder of GreenPal
- Jon Coffelt (1981–1984) – New York City artist, painter, sculptor
- Erika Costell – YouTuber, model, and singer
- Brandon Curry – IFBB professional bodybuilder
- Donna Scott Davenport – embattled Rutherford County, Tennessee juvenile court judge
- Lane Davies – actor, known for portraying Mason Capwell in Santa Barbara
- Mark Gwyn – director, Tennessee Bureau of Investigation (2004–2018)
- Keel Hunt (1971) – journalist and author
- Nick Levay (b. 1977) – chief security officer at organizations such as the Council on Foreign Relations
- Sondra Locke (1944–2018) – Oscar-nominated actress and director
- Bayer Mack – writer, record executive and film producer
- Mary Scales – first black MTSU faculty member and first black female Murfreesboro city councilperson
- Wayne White – artist, known for his work on Pee-wee's Playhouse
