= List of Middle Tennessee Blue Raiders football seasons =

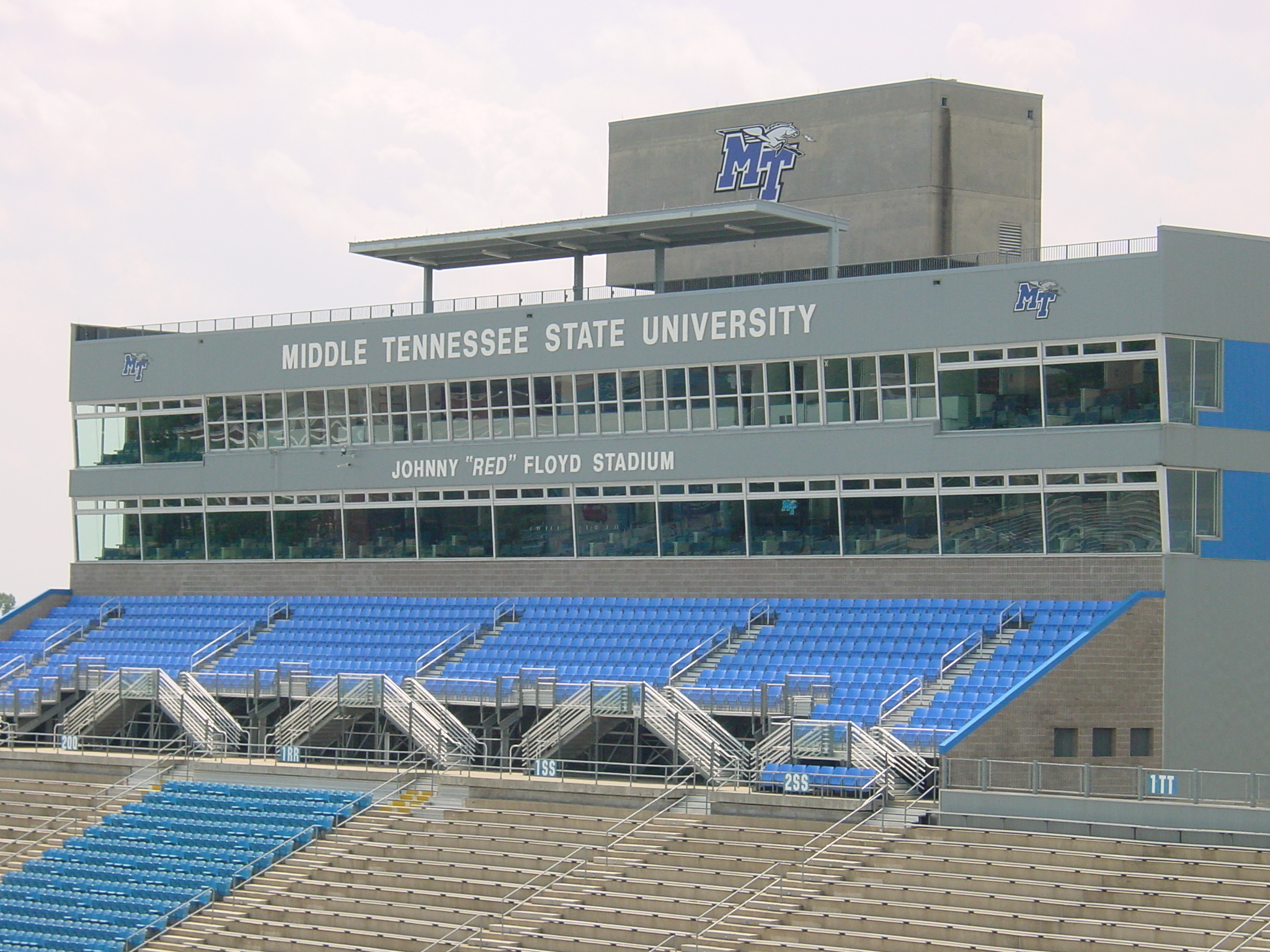
Johnny "Red" Floyd Stadium, the home of MTSU football since 1933.

This is a list of seasons completed by the Middle Tennessee Blue Raiders football team. The Blue Raiders compete in the NCAA Division I Football Bowl Subdivision (FBS) as a member of Conference USA. They play their home games at Johnny "Red" Floyd Stadium, which has a seating capacity of 30,788.

Middle Tennessee began playing football in 1911 as a small-college program. Following the NCAA's reclassification into divisions in 1973, the Blue Raiders competed as a Division II program for five seasons before moving up to the Division I-AA (now FCS) level in 1978. MTSU made seven appearances in the I-AA/FCS playoff before transitioning to Division I-A/FBS in 1999.

The Blue Raiders have won 13 conference championships in program history and have played in 13 bowl games, winning eight. The team is currently led by second-year head coach Derek Mason, who took over for Rick Stockstill after 18 years at the helm.

== Seasons ==
Legend

† National champions
^{†} Conference champions
^{‡} Division champions
^ Bowl game berth / playoff result

List of Middle Tennessee Blue Raiders football seasons
Season	Team	Head coach	Conference	Regular season results							Postseason results	Final ranking	
Season	Team	Head coach	Conference	Overall			Conference				Bowl game/Playoff result	AP/NCAA Poll	Coaches' Poll
Season	Team	Head coach	Conference	Win	Loss	Tie	Win	Loss	Tie	Finish	Bowl game/Playoff result	AP/NCAA Poll	Coaches' Poll
Middle Tennessee State Normal
1911	1911	L. T. Weber	Independent	0	2	0					—	—	—
1912	1912	L. T. Weber	Independent	1	0	0					—	—	—
1913	1913	Alfred B. Miles	Independent	5	1	1					—	—	—
1914	1914	Alfred B. Miles	Independent	5	0	1					—	—	—
1915	1915	Alfred B. Miles	Independent	3	3	1					—	—	—
1916	1916	Alfred B. Miles	Independent	5	2	0					—	—	—
1917	1917	Johnny Floyd	Independent	7	0	0					—	—	—
1918		No team due to World War I	Independent										
1919	1919	Alfred B. Miles	Independent	6	0	0					—	—	—
1920	1920	Alfred B. Miles	Independent	4	1	0					—	—	—
1921	1921	Alfred B. Miles	Independent	3	2	1					—	—	—
1922	1922	Alfred B. Miles	Independent	2	6	0					—	—	—
1923	1923	Alfred B. Miles	Independent	3	1	0					—	—	—
1924	1924	Guy Stephenson	Independent	1	5	0					—	—	—
Middle Tennessee State Teachers
1925	1925	Guy Stephenson	Independent	3	4	2					—	—	—
1926	1926	Frank Faulkinberry	Independent	4	2	1					—	—	—
1927	1927	Frank Faulkinberry	Independent	6	2	0					—	—	—
1928	1928	Frank Faulkinberry	Independent	2	4	1					—	—	—
1929	1929	Frank Faulkinberry	Independent	6	3	1					—	—	—
1930	1930	Frank Faulkinberry	Independent	5	5	1					—	—	—
1931	1931	Frank Faulkinberry	Independent	6	4	0					—	—	—
1932	1932	Frank Faulkinberry	Independent	4	6	0					—	—	—
1933	1933	E. M. Waller	Independent	1	7	1					—	—	—
Middle Tennessee State Teachers Blue Raiders
1934	1934	E. M. Waller	Independent	2	7	0					—	—	—
1935	1935	Johnny Floyd	Independent	8	0	0					—	—	—
1936	1936	Johnny Floyd	Independent	7	1	0					—	—	—
1937	1937	Johnny Floyd	Independent	6	1	1					—	—	—
1938	1938	Johnny Floyd	Independent	2	6	0					—	—	—
1939	1939	Ernest Alley	Independent	1	6	1					—	—	—
1940	1940	Elwin W. Midgett	Independent	4	4	0					—	—	—
1941	1941	Elwin W. Midgett	Independent	4	3	1					—	—	—
1942	1942	Elwin W. Midgett	Independent	4	2	1					—	—	—
1943		Elwin W. Midgett	Independent	No team due to World War II									
1944		Elwin W. Midgett	Independent	No team due to World War II									
1945		Elwin W. Midgett	Independent	No team due to World War II									
1946	1946	Elwin W. Midgett	Independent	6	2	1					—	—	—
Middle Tennessee Blue Raiders
1947	1947	Charles M. Murphy	Independent	9	1	0					—	—	—
1948	1948	Charles M. Murphy	Independent	5	5	0					—	—	—
1949	1949	Charles M. Murphy	Independent	8	0	1					—	—	—
1950	1950	Charles M. Murphy	Independent	9	2	0					—	—	—
1951	1951	Charles M. Murphy	Independent	7	2	2					—	—	—
1952	1952	Charles M. Murphy	Ohio Valley	6	5	0	2	2	0	4th	—	—	—
1953	1953	Charles M. Murphy	Ohio Valley	7	4	0	3	2	0	3rd	—	—	—
1954	1954	Charles M. Murphy	Ohio Valley	4	4	2	2	2	1	4th	—	—	—
1955	1955	Charles M. Murphy	Ohio Valley	7	2	1	4	1	0	2nd	—	—	—
1956	1956^{†}	Charles M. Murphy	Ohio Valley	7	3	0	5	0	0	1st^{†}	Lost 1956 Refrigerator Bowl against Sam Houston State, 13–27 ^	—	—
1957	1957^{†}	Charles M. Murphy	Ohio Valley	10	0	0	5	0	0	1st^{†}	—	—	—
1958	1958^{†}	Charles M. Murphy	Ohio Valley	8	2	0	5	1	0	1st^{†}	—	—	11
1959	1959^{†}	Charles M. Murphy	Ohio Valley	10	0	1	5	0	1	1st^{†}	Won 1960 Tangerine Bowl against Presbyterian, 21–12 ^	—	3
1960	1960	Charles M. Murphy	Ohio Valley	5	5	0	4	3	0	2nd	—	—	—
1961	1961	Charles M. Murphy	Ohio Valley	7	4	0	5	1	0	2nd	Lost 1961 Tangerine Bowl against Lamar Tech, 14–21 ^	—	—
1962	1962^{†}	Charles M. Murphy	Ohio Valley	6	4	0	4	2	0	1st^{†}	—	—	—
1963	1963	Charles M. Murphy	Ohio Valley	8	2	0	6	1	0	2nd	—	—	—
1964	1964^{†}	Charles M. Murphy	Ohio Valley	8	2	1	6	1	0	1st^{†}	Won 1964 Grantland Rice Bowl against Muskingum, 20–0 ^	—	—
1965	1965^{†}	Charles M. Murphy	Ohio Valley	10	0	0	7	0	0	1st^{†}	—	—	2
1966	1966	Charles M. Murphy	Ohio Valley	7	3	0	5	2	0	2nd	—	—	—
1967	1967	Charles M. Murphy	Ohio Valley	5	5	0	4	3	0	3rd	—	—	—
1968	1968	Charles M. Murphy	Ohio Valley	2	8	0	1	6	0	8th	—	—	—
1969	1969	Donald E. Fuoss	Ohio Valley	1	9	0	1	6	0	8th	—	—	—
1970	1970	Bill Peck	Ohio Valley	6	3	1	2	3	1	5th	—	—	—
1971	1971	Bill Peck	Ohio Valley	7	4	0	5	2	0	T-2nd	—	—	—
1972	1972	Bill Peck	Ohio Valley	7	3	1	4	2	1	3rd	—	—	—
1973 (Note: Middle Tennessee was classified as an NCAA Division II program in 1973 when the NCAA began the divisional model.)	1973	Bill Peck	Ohio Valley	4	7	0	3	4	0	T-5th	—	—	—
1974	1974	Bill Peck	Ohio Valley	3	8	0	2	5	0	6th	—	—	—
1975	1975	Ben Hurt	Ohio Valley	4	7	0	3	4	0	6th	—	—	—
1976	1976	Ben Hurt	Ohio Valley	4	7	0	2	5	0	T-7th	—	—	—
1977	1977	Ben Hurt	Ohio Valley	3	8	0	3	4	0	5th	—	—	—
1978 (Note: In 1978, the NCAA subdivided Division I into I-A and I-AA. Middle Tennessee moved up to the I-AA level along with the rest of the Ohio Valley Conference.)	1978	Ben Hurt	Ohio Valley	1	9	1	1	5	0	7th	—	—	—
1979	1979	Boots Donnelly	Ohio Valley	1	9	0	1	5	0	6th	—	—	—
1980	1980	Boots Donnelly	Ohio Valley	2	8	0	2	5	0	7th	—	—	—
1981	1981	Boots Donnelly	Ohio Valley	6	5	0	4	4	0	T-4th	—	—	—
1982	1982	Boots Donnelly	Ohio Valley	8	3	0	4	3	0	3rd	—	—	—
1983	1983	Boots Donnelly	Ohio Valley	8	2	0	5	2	0	T-2nd	—	16	—
1984	1984	Boots Donnelly	Ohio Valley	11	3	0	5	2	0	T-2nd	NCAA Division I-AA Playoffs — Semifinals ^	7	—
1985	1985^{†}	Boots Donnelly	Ohio Valley	11	1	0	7	0	0	1st^{†}	NCAA Division I-AA Playoffs — Quarterfinals ^	1	—
1986	1986	Boots Donnelly	Ohio Valley	6	5	0	4	3	0	T-3rd	—	—	—
1987	1987	Boots Donnelly	Ohio Valley	6	5	0	4	2	0	3rd	—	—	—
1988	1988	Boots Donnelly	Ohio Valley	7	4	0	4	2	0	2nd	—	—	—
1989	1989^{†}	Boots Donnelly	Ohio Valley	9	4	0	6	0	0	1st^{†}	NCAA Division I-AA Playoffs — Quarterfinals ^	T-10	—
1990	1990^{†}	Boots Donnelly	Ohio Valley	11	2	0	5	1	0	1st^{†}	NCAA Division I-AA Playoffs — Quarterfinals ^	1	—
1991	1991	Boots Donnelly	Ohio Valley	9	4	0	6	1	0	2nd	NCAA Division I-AA Playoffs — Quarterfinals ^	9	—
1992	1992^{†}	Boots Donnelly	Ohio Valley	10	3	0	8	0	0	1st^{†}	NCAA Division I-AA Playoffs — Quarterfinals ^	4	—
1993	1993	Boots Donnelly	Ohio Valley	5	6	0	4	4	0	T-4th	—	—	—
1994	1994	Boots Donnelly	Ohio Valley	8	3	1	7	1	0	2nd	NCAA Division I-AA Playoffs — First Round ^	16	—
1995	1995	Boots Donnelly	Ohio Valley	7	4	0	6	2	0	3rd	—	25	—
1996 (Note: Overtime rules were added for NCAA football in 1996, eliminating ties.)	1996	Boots Donnelly	Ohio Valley	6	5		4	4		T-4th	—	—	—
1997	1997	Boots Donnelly	Ohio Valley	4	6		2	5		6th	—	—	—
1998	1998	Boots Donnelly	Ohio Valley	5	5		5	2		T-2nd	—	—	—
1999 (Note: Middle Tennessee moved up to Division I-A in 1999, playing as an independent.)	1999	Andy McCollum	Independent	3	8						—	—	—
2000	2000	Andy McCollum	Independent	6	5						—	—	—
2001	2001^{†}	Andy McCollum	Sun Belt	8	3		5	1		T-1st^{†}	—	—	—
2002	2002	Andy McCollum	Sun Belt	4	8		2	4		T-4th	—	—	—
2003	2003	Andy McCollum	Sun Belt	4	8		4	3		T-2nd	—	—	—
2004	2004	Andy McCollum	Sun Belt	5	6		4	4		5th	—	—	—
2005	2005	Andy McCollum	Sun Belt	4	7		3	4		T-4th	—	—	—
2006	2006^{†}	Rick Stockstill	Sun Belt	7	6		6	1		T-1st^{†}	Lost 2006 Motor City Bowl against Central Michigan, 14–31 ^	—	—
2007	2007	Rick Stockstill	Sun Belt	5	7		4	3		T-3rd	—	—	—
2008	2008	Rick Stockstill	Sun Belt	5	7		4	3		T-5th	—	—	—
2009	2009	Rick Stockstill	Sun Belt	10	3		7	1		T-2nd	Won 2009 New Orleans Bowl against Southern Miss, 42–32 ^	—	—
2010	2010	Rick Stockstill	Sun Belt	6	7		5	3		3rd	Lost 2011 GoDaddy.com Bowl against Miami (OH), 21–35 ^	—	—
2011	2011	Rick Stockstill	Sun Belt	2	10		1	7		8th	—	—	—
2012	2012	Rick Stockstill	Sun Belt	8	4		6	2		T-2nd	—	—	—
2013	2013	Rick Stockstill	Conference USA	8	5		6	2		T-2nd	Lost 2013 Armed Forces Bowl against Navy, 6–24 ^	—	—
2014	2014	Rick Stockstill	Conference USA	6	6		5	3		2nd	—	—	—
2015	2015	Rick Stockstill	Conference USA	7	6		6	2		2nd	Lost 2015 Bahamas Bowl against Western Michigan, 31–45 ^	—	—
2016	2016	Rick Stockstill	Conference USA	8	5		5	3		3rd	Lost 2016 Hawaii Bowl against Hawaii, 35-52 ^	—	—
2017	2017	Rick Stockstill	Conference USA	7	6		4	4		T-3rd	Won 2017 Camellia Bowl against Arkansas State, 35-30 ^	—	—
2018	2018	Rick Stockstill	Conference USA	8	6		7	1		1st^{‡}	Lost 2018 New Orleans Bowl against Appalachian State, 13–45 ^	—	—
2019	2019	Rick Stockstill	Conference USA	4	8		3	5		T-5th	—	—	—
2020	2020	Rick Stockstill	Conference USA	3	6		2	4		5th	—	—	—
2021	2021	Rick Stockstill	Conference USA	7	6		4	4		4th	Won 2021 Bahamas Bowl against Toledo, 31–24 ^	—	—
2022	2022	Rick Stockstill	Conference USA	8	5		4	4		T-4th	Won 2022 Hawaii Bowl against San Diego State, 25–23 ^	—	—
2023	2023	Rick Stockstill	Conference USA	4	8		3	5		5th	—	—	—
2024	2024	Derek Mason	Conference USA	3	9		2	6		T-8th	—	—	—
2025	2025	Derek Mason	Conference USA	3	9		2	6		T-9th	—	—	—
Totals				All-time: 614–481–28 (.559)			Conference: 296–200–4 (.596)				Postseason: 11–15–0 (.423)		
