= List of Middle Tennessee Blue Raiders in the NFL draft =

This is a list of Middle Tennessee Blue Raiders football players in the NFL draft.

== Key ==
B	Back	K	Kicker	NT	Nose tackle
C	Center	LB	Linebacker	FB	Fullback
DB	Defensive back	P	Punter	HB	Halfback
DE	Defensive end	QB	Quarterback	WR	Wide receiver
DT	Defensive tackle	RB	Running back	G	Guard
E	End	T	Offensive tackle	TE	Tight end

== Selections ==
Year	Round	Pick	Overall	Player	Team	Position
1954	21	10	251	Howard Alsup	San Francisco 49ers	T
1956	16	4	185	Billy Hix	Philadelphia Eagles	T
1956	30	5	354	Terry Sweeney	Baltimore Colts	B
1957	7	11	84	Jerry DeLucca	Chicago Bears	T
1957	10	7	116	Jerry Hurst	San Francisco 49ers	E
1958	26	12	313	Joe Bruce	Detroit Lions	T
1958	30	3	352	Bobby Halum	Chicago Bears	B
1968	10	6	252	Bob Langford	Denver Broncos	T
1975	17	23	439	Dwaine Copeland	Miami Dolphins	RB
1976	8	17	226	Bobby Joe Easter	Buffalo Bills	RB
1976	14	17	392	Tony Williams	Buffalo Bills	WR
1978	12	25	331	Mike Moore	Miami Dolphins	RB
1983	7	25	193	James Griffin	Cincinnati Bengals	DB
1986	6	24	162	Don Griffin	San Francisco 49ers	DB
1987	12	17	324	Tony Burse	Seattle Seahawks	RB
1991	8	12	207	Marty Carter	Tampa Bay Buccaneers	DB
1992	6	2	142	Chris Burns	Cincinnati Bengals	DT
1992	6	4	144	Joe Campbell	Los Angeles Rams	RB
1993	3	27	83	Mike Caldwell	Cleveland Browns	LB
1993	5	22	134	Walter Dunson	San Diego Chargers	WR
1998	3	25	86	Jonathan Quinn	Jacksonville Jaguars	QB
1999	7	15	221	Sulecio Sanford	Chicago Bears	WR
2002	7	11	222	Kendall Newson	Jacksonville Jaguars	WR
2003	2	28	60	Tyrone Calico	Tennessee Titans	WR
2008	6	1	167	Erik Walden	Dallas Cowboys	DE
2010	7	5	212	Chris McCoy	Miami Dolphins	LB
2011	5	16	147	Rod Issac	Jacksonville Jaguars	DB
2014	5	32	172	Jimmy Staten	Seattle Seahawks	DT
2016	3	1	64	Kevin Byard	Tennessee Titans	DB
2018	7	22	240	Richie James	San Francisco 49ers	WR
2026	7	24	240	Parker Hughes	Jacksonville Jaguars	LB
