= 2015 Bahamas Bowl =

2015 Popeyes Bahamas Bowl
- 2nd Bahamas Bowl
| Middle Tennessee Blue Raiders | Western Michigan Broncos |
| (7–5) | (7–5) |
| C-USA | MAC |
| 31 | 45 |
| Head coach: Rick Stockstill | Head coach: P. J. Fleck |
| | 1 | 2 | 3 | 4 | Total |
|---|---|---|---|---|---|
| Middle Tennessee | 17 | 0 | 7 | 7 | 31 |
| Western Michigan | 17 | 0 | 7 | 21 | 45 |
- Date: December 24, 2015
- Season: 2015
- Stadium: Thomas Robinson Stadium
- Location: Nassau, Bahamas
- MVP: Offensive: Western Michigan RB Jamauri Bogan; Defensive: Western Michigan LB Grant DePalma
- Favorite: Western Michigan by 2½
- Referee: Brandon Cruse (Mtn. West)
- Attendance: 13,123
- Payout: US$TBD

United States TV coverage
- Network: ESPN/RedVoice, LLC.
- Announcers: Steve Levy, Mack Brown, Mark May, & Kaylee Hartung (ESPN); Brian Hanni & Rob Best (RedVoice)

The 2015 Bahamas Bowl was a post-season American college football bowl game played on December 24, 2015 at Thomas Robinson Stadium in Nassau in the Bahamas. The second edition of the Bahamas Bowl featured the Middle Tennessee Blue Raiders of Conference USA against the Western Michigan Broncos of the Mid-American Conference. It began at noon EST and air on ESPN. It was one of the 2015–16 bowl games that concluded the 2015 FBS football season. Sponsored by the Popeyes Louisiana Kitchen restaurant chain, the game is officially known as the Popeyes Bahamas Bowl.

The game is best remembered as the Broncos' first bowl victory in school history.

== Teams ==
The game featured the Middle Tennessee Blue Raiders against the Western Michigan Broncos.

=== Middle Tennessee Blue Raiders ===
After finishing their regular season 7–5, bowl director Richard Giannini extended an invitation for the Blue Raiders to play in the game, which they accepted.

This was the Blue Raiders' seventh bowl game (they are now 3–4 all-time in bowl games thus far) and their first since the 2013 Armed Forces Bowl, where they lost to Navy by a score of 24–6. It was also their third bowl game against a MAC opponent; the Blue Raiders likewise lost both previous meetings, losing in the 2006 Motor City Bowl to Central Michigan by a score of 31–14 and in the 2011 GoDaddy.com Bowl to the Miami (Ohio) by a score of 35–21.

=== Western Michigan Broncos ===
After finishing their regular season 7–5, bowl director Richard Giannini extended an invitation for the Broncos to play in the game, which they accepted.

This was the Broncos' seventh bowl game, where they once again sought their first bowl victory in school history, having previously had an 0–6 all-time record in bowl games. It was also the Broncos' second consecutive bowl appearance (following the Famous Idaho Potato Bowl, where they lost to Air Force by a score of 38–24), marking the first time in school history the Broncos have been to back-to-back bowls. In addition, it was the second time the Broncos have faced an opponent from Conference USA in a bowl game, having previously lost the 2008 Texas Bowl to the Rice Owls by a score of 38–14.

== Game summary ==
=== Scoring Summary ===
Scoring summary

| Quarter | Time | Drive | | | Team | Scoring information | Score | |
| Quarter | Time | Plays | Yards | TOP | Team | Scoring information | MT | WMU |
|---|---|---|---|---|---|---|---|---|
| 1 | 13:43 | 5 | 75 | 1:17 | MT | Richie James 46-yard touchdown run, Cody Clark kick good | 7 | 0 |
| 1 | 12:43 | 3 | 71 | 1:00 | WMU | Jamauri Bogan 62-yard touchdown run, Andrew Haldeman kick good | 7 | 7 |
| 1 | 11:04 | 5 | 75 | 1:39 | MT | Richie James 44-yard touchdown reception from Brent Stockstill, Cody Clark kick good | 14 | 7 |
| 1 | 3:23 | 6 | 28 | 2:32 | WMU | 47-yard field goal by Andrew Haldeman | 14 | 10 |
| 1 | 1:04 | 6 | 69 | 2:19 | MT | 23-yard field goal by Cody Clark | 17 | 10 |
| 1 | 0:03 | 2 | 85 | 1:01 | WMU | Corey Davis 80-yard touchdown reception from Zach Terrell, Andrew Haldeman kick good | 17 | 17 |
| 3 | 12:03 | 6 | 69 | 2:57 | WMU | Jamauri Bogan 46-yard touchdown run, Andrew Haldeman kick good | 17 | 24 |
| 3 | 0:18 | 2 | 32 | 0:28 | MT | Christian Collins 17-yard touchdown reception from Brent Stockstill, Cody Clark kick good | 24 | 24 |
| 4 | 12:47 | 5 | 75 | 2:31 | WMU | Daniel Braverman 68-yard touchdown reception from Zach Terrell, Andrew Haldeman kick good | 24 | 31 |
| 4 | 9:41 | 6 | 70 | 3:06 | MT | Richie James 29-yard touchdown reception from Brent Stockstill, Cody Clark kick good | 31 | 31 |
| 4 | 6:12 | 6 | 82 | 3:29 | WMU | Jamauri Bogan 1-yard touchdown run, Andrew Haldeman kick good | 31 | 38 |
| 4 | 5:00 | 2 | 4 | 0:47 | WMU | Jamauri Bogan 1-yard touchdown run, Andrew Haldeman kick good | 31 | 45 |
| "TOP" = time of possession. For other American football terms, see Glossary of American football. | | | | | | | 31 | 45 |

=== Statistics ===
| Statistics | MT | WMU |
|---|---|---|
| First downs | 18 | 18 |
| Plays–yards | 65–442 | 68–613 |
| Rushes–yards | 26–115 | 41–282 |
| Passing yards | 327 | 331 |
| Passing: Comp–Att–Int | 26–39–1 | 19–27–1 |
| Time of possession | 25:12 | 34:48 |
