= 2017 Camellia Bowl =

2017 Raycom Media Camellia Bowl
- 4th Camellia Bowl
Middle Tennessee Blue Raiders	Arkansas State Red Wolves
(6–6)	(7–4)
C–USA	Sun Belt
35	30
Head coach: Rick Stockstill	Head coach: Blake Anderson
	1	2	3	4	Total
Middle Tennessee	7	14	7	7	35
Arkansas State	3	7	7	13	30
- Date: December 16, 2017
- Season: 2017
- Stadium: Cramton Bowl
- Location: Montgomery, Alabama
- MVP: Middle Tennessee LB Darius Harris
- Referee: Kevin Boitmann (Mtn. West)
- Attendance: 20,612

United States TV coverage
- Network: ESPN
- Announcers: Taylor Zarzour, Andre Ware, Olivia Harlan; Radio:John Brickley, Brad Edwards

The 2017 Camellia Bowl was a postseason college football bowl game played at the Cramton Bowl in Montgomery, Alabama, on December 16, 2017. The game was the fourth edition of the Camellia Bowl and featured the Middle Tennessee Blue Raiders of Conference USA and the Arkansas State Red Wolves of the Sun Belt Conference. Sponsored by broadcasting company Raycom Media, the game was officially known as the Raycom Media Camellia Bowl.

== Teams ==
=== Middle Tennessee Blue Raiders ===
The Middle Tennessee Blue Raiders finished the 2017 regular season with a 6–6 record. This was their first appearance in the Camellia Bowl.

=== Arkansas State Red Wolves ===
The Arkansas State Red Wolves finished the 2017 regular season with a 7–4 record. This was their first appearance in the Camellia Bowl.

== Game summary ==
=== Scoring summary ===
Scoring summary

Quarter	Time	Drive			Team	Scoring information	Score	
Quarter	Time	Plays	Yards	TOP	Team	Scoring information	MTSU	ARST
1	11:52	7	38	1:57	ARST	20-yard field goal by Sawyer Williams	0	3
1	9:25	4	65	2:27	MTSU	Terelle West 45-yard touchdown run, Canon Rooker kick good	7	3
2	5:41				MTSU	Fumble recovery returned 54 yards for touchdown by D.J. Sanders, Canon Rooker kick good	14	3
2	1:59	13	85	3:42	ARST	Justice Hansen 1-yard touchdown run, Sawyer Williams kick good	14	10
2	0:45	3	50	1:14	MTSU	Ruben Garnett 31-yard touchdown reception from Brent Stockstill, Canon Rooker kick good	21	10
3	9:16	12	73	4:38	MTSU	Tavares Thomas 2-yard touchdown run, Canon Rooker kick good	28	10
3	6:19	10	58	2:57	ARST	Justin McInnis 20-yard touchdown reception from Justice Hansen, Sawyer Williams kick good	28	17
4	14:24	9	47	2:58	ARST	Warren Wand 2-yard touchdown reception from Justice Hansen, 2-point pass failed	28	23
4	12:08	6	75	2:16	MTSU	Shane Tucker 30-yard touchdown reception from Brent Stockstill, Canon Rooker kick good	35	23
4	5:03	4	51	0:48	ARST	Christian Booker 41-yard touchdown reception from Justice Hansen, Sawyer Williams kick good	35	30
"TOP" = time of possession. For other American football terms, see Glossary of American football.							35	30

=== Statistics ===
	1	2	3	4	Total
Blue Raiders	7	14	7	7	35
Red Wolves	3	7	7	13	30

Statistics	MTSU	ARST
First downs	17	32
Plays–yards	64–352	97–462
Rushes–yards	29–120	39–104
Passing yards	232	358
Passing: Comp–Att–Int	19–35–3	32–58–1
Time of possession	29:42	30:18

Team	Category	Player	Statistics
Middle Tennessee	Passing	Brent Stockstill	19/35, 232 yds, 2 TD, 3 INT
Middle Tennessee	Rushing	Terelle West	10 car, 65 yds, 1 TD
Middle Tennessee	Receiving	Shane Tucker	4 rec, 63 yds, 1 TD
Arkansas State	Passing	Justice Hansen	31/57, 337 yds, 3 TD, 1 INT
Arkansas State	Rushing	Warren Wand	13 rec, 46 yds
Arkansas State	Receiving	Justin McInnis	7 rec, 107 yds, 1 TD
