= Rod Issac =

American football player (born 1989)

Rod Isaac
No. 20, 26
- Position: Cornerback

Personal information
- Born: February 20, 1989 (age 37); Miami, Florida, U.S.
- Listed height: 5 ft 11 in (1.80 m)
- Listed weight: 196 lb (89 kg)

Career information
- High school: West Little River (FL) Miami Central
- College: Middle Tennessee State
- NFL draft: 2011: 5th round, 147th overall pick

Career history
- Jacksonville Jaguars (2011–2012); Tampa Bay Storm (2013–2015); Orlando Predators (2015–2016)

Awards and highlights
- First-team All-Sun Belt (2010)

Career AFL statistics
- Total tackles: 139.5
- Interceptions: 6
- Pass deflections: 19
- Forced fumbles: 1
- Fumble recoveries: 3
- Stats at ArenaFan.com
- Stats at Pro Football Reference

Roderick Devone Issac (born February 20, 1989) is an American former professional football cornerback. He was selected by the Jacksonville Jaguars as a fifth round pick in the 2011 NFL draft. He played college football at Middle Tennessee State University.

== Early life ==
Issac attended Miami Central High School in Miami, Florida.

== College career ==
Issac was a senior captain at Middle Tennessee State University. Issac was voted first team all-conference by the coaches and media of the Sun Belt Conference.

== Professional career ==
Pre-draft measurables
Height	Weight	40-yard dash	10-yard split	20-yard split	20-yard shuttle	Three-cone drill	Vertical jump	Broad jump	Bench press
5 ft 10 3/4 in (1.80 m)	196 lb (89 kg)	4.41 s	1.56 s	2.57 s	4.12 s	6.90 s	33.5 in (0.85 m)	9 ft 7 in (2.92 m)	22 reps
All values from Pro Day

=== Jacksonville Jaguars ===
Issac was selected by the Jacksonville Jaguars in the fifth round of the 2011 NFL draft with the 147th overall pick. His fifth-round selection was the highest for a Middle Tennessee player since wide receiver Tyrone Calico went to the Tennessee Titans in the second round of the 2003 NFL draft.

Issac was released on August 31, 2012.

=== Tampa Bay Storm ===
On July 2, 2013, Issac was assigned to the Tampa Bay Storm of the Arena Football League. Issac was reassigned by the Storm on July 18, 2013. Issac was again assigned by the Storm on March 1, 2014. He was placed on reassignment on March 20, 2015.
