= 2022 Hawaii Bowl =

Postseason college football bowl game

2022 EasyPost Hawaii Bowl
- 19th Hawaii Bowl
Middle Tennessee Blue Raiders	San Diego State Aztecs
(7–5)	(7–5)
C–USA	MWC
25	23
Head coach: Rick Stockstill	Head coach: Brady Hoke
	1	2	3	4	Total
Middle Tennessee	0	13	3	9	25
San Diego State	14	0	3	6	23
- Date: December 24, 2022
- Season: 2022
- Stadium: Clarence T. C. Ching Athletics Complex
- Location: Honolulu, Hawaii
- MVP: Jordan Ferguson (DE, Middle Tennessee)
- Favorite: San Diego State by 7
- Referee: Edwin Lee (American)
- Attendance: 6,605
- Payout: US$1,200,000

United States TV coverage
- Network: ESPN
- Announcers: Mike Monaco (play-by-play), Rod Gilmore (analyst), and Quint Kessenich (sideline)

The 2022 Hawaii Bowl was a college football bowl game played on December 24, 2022, at Clarence T. C. Ching Athletics Complex in Honolulu, Hawaii. The 19th annual Hawaii Bowl, the game featured the Middle Tennessee Blue Raiders from Conference USA (C-USA) and the San Diego State Aztecs from the Mountain West Conference. The game began at 3:03 p.m. HST (8:03 p.m. EST) and was aired on ESPN. It was one of the 2022–23 bowl games concluding the 2022 FBS football season. Sponsored by shipping API EasyPost, the game was officially known as the EasyPost Hawaii Bowl. Due to cancellations in 2020 and 2021 for COVID-19 related issues, this was the first Hawaii Bowl since 2019.

== Teams ==
The Hawaii Bowl featured the Middle Tennessee Blue Raiders from Conference USA (C–USA) and the San Diego State Aztecs from the Mountain West Conference (MWC). This was the first meeting between the two teams.

=== Middle Tennessee ===
Middle Tennessee entered the bowl with a 7–5 record (4–4 in conference). Middle Tennessee finished tied for fourth in the final Conference-USA standings for the season, posting the same conference record as both UAB and Florida Atlantic. This was Middle Tennessee's 14th bowl game appearance and 9th at the NCAA Division I level, with a prior record of 5–8 in bowl games (3–6 at Division I). It was Middle Tennessee's second appearance in the Hawaii Bowl, having previously played in the 2016 edition.

=== San Diego State ===
San Diego State entered the bowl with a 7–5 record (5–3 in conference). San Diego State tied for second in the West Division of the Mountain West Conference with San Jose State. This was San Diego State's 20th bowl game appearance, with a prior record of 10–9 in bowl games. This was San Diego State's second Hawaii Bowl appearance, having previously played in the 2015 edition. It was also San Diego State's third postseason game in Honolulu; the school played in the 1952 Pineapple Bowl where they defeated Hawaii, 34–13.

== Game summary ==
2022 EasyPost Hawaii Bowl

Quarter	1	2	3	4	Total
Middle Tennessee	0	13	3	9	25
San Diego State	14	0	3	6	23

at Clarence T. C. Ching Athletics Complex • Honolulu, Hawaii

- Date: Saturday, December 24, 2022
- Game time: 3:00 p.m. HST
- Game weather: Sunny • Temperature: 79 °F (26 °C) • Wind: 9 mph (14 km/h) southwest
- Game attendance: 6,605
- Referee: Edwin Lee
- TV announcers (ESPN): Mike Monaco (play-by-play), Rod Gilmore (analyst), and Quint Kessenich (sideline)
- Box score

Scoring summary

Quarter	Time	Drive			Team	Scoring information	Score	
Quarter	Time	Plays	Yards	TOP	Team	Scoring information	Middle Tennessee	San Diego State
1	7:18	8	71	3:21	SDSU	Mark Redman 9-yard touchdown reception from Jalen Mayden, Jack Browning kick good	0	7
1	4:42	3	73	0:57	SDSU	Kenan Christon 73-yard touchdown reception from Jalen Mayden, Jack Browning kick good	0	14
2	11:49	5	36	1:03	MTSU	44-yard field goal by Zeke Rankin	3	14
2	3:14	4	17	1:34	MTSU	Jordan Ferguson 8-yard touchdown reception from Chase Cunningham, Zeke Rankin kick good	10	14
2	0:22	4	-6	0:19	MTSU	49-yard field goal by Zeke Rankin	13	14
3	6:59	7	14	2:40	MTSU	26-yard field goal by Zeke Rankin	16	14
3	1:26	13	54	5:33	SDSU	39-yard field goal by Jack Browning	16	17
4	13:25	2	25	0:35	MTSU	Jaylin Lane 16-yard touchdown reception from Chase Cunningham, 2-point run failed	22	17
4	10:15	8	56	3:10	SDSU	36-yard field goal by Jack Browning	22	20
4	5:43	7	45	3:08	SDSU	52-yard field goal by Jack Browning	22	23
4	2:05	12	55	3:38	MTSU	37-yard field goal by Zeke Rankin	25	23
"TOP" = time of possession. For other American football terms, see Glossary of American football.							25	23

== Statistics ==
Team statistical comparison
Statistic	Middle Tennessee	San Diego State
First downs	14	14
First downs rushing	0	4
First downs passing	12	9
First downs penalty	2	1
Third down efficiency	3–17	4–16
Fourth down efficiency	1–2	2–4
Total plays–net yards	73–170	75–364
Rushing attempts–net yards	30–(−66)	32–55
Yards per rush	(−2.2)	1.7
Yards passing	236	309
Pass completions–attempts	26–43	19–43
Interceptions thrown	1	3
Punt returns–total yards	3–48	1–3
Kickoff returns–total yards	0–0	5–111
Punts–average yardage	7–54.7	4–48.8
Fumbles–lost	1–0	2–2
Penalties–yards	5–50	9–79
Time of possession	27:39	32:21

Middle Tennessee statistics
Blue Raiders passing
	C–A	Yds	TD–INT
Chase Cunningham	26–43	236	2–1
Blue Raiders rushing
	Car	Yds	TD
Frank Peasant	17	27	0
Darius Bracy	2	7	0
Team	2	(−9)	0
Chase Cunningham	9	(−91)	0
Blue Raiders receiving
	Rec	Yds	TD
Jaylin Lane	10	111	1
Izaiah Gathings	7	69	0
Yusuf Ali	3	24	0
Frank Peasant	2	10	0
Jordan Ferguson	1	8	1
DJ England-Chisolm	1	7	0
Elijah Metcalf	1	4	0
Darius Bracy	1	3	0

San Diego State statistics
Aztecs passing
	C–A	Yds	TD–INT
Jalen Mayden	19–43	309	2–3
Aztecs rushing
	Car	Yds	TD
Garret Fountain	1	27	0
Jalen Mayden	12	26	0
Jordan Byrd	11	1	0
Chance Bell	4	1	0
Jesse Matthews	1	1	0
Kenan Christon	1	0	0
Mekhi Shaw	1	0	0
Team	1	(−1)	0
Aztecs receiving
	Rec	Yds	TD
Kenan Christon	2	111	1
Jesse Matthews	7	99	0
Tyrell Shavers	4	62	0
Darius De Los Reyes	2	18	0
Mark Redman	1	9	1
Jordan Byrd	2	7	0
Josh Nicholson	1	3	0
