= GreenPal =

American online platform for landscapers

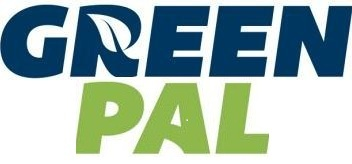
- Available in: English
- Founded: April 1, 2012; 14 years ago
- Area served: United States
- Founders: Bryan M. Clayton (CEO); Zach Hendrix (CTO); Gene Caballero (COO); Ross Brooks
- Industry: Online marketplace Freelance Marketplace; Online outsourcing
- Services: Landscaping
- Website: www.yourgreenpal.com
- Commercial: Yes
- Registration: Required
- Users: 1 million
- Current status: Active

GreenPal is an online freelancing platform that connects landscapers to clients in the United States. The company is based in Nashville, Tennessee and was founded in 2012. GreenPal's business model was inspired by Uber, Airbnb, and Lyft. As of January 2020, the company operated in 45 states and had approximately 1 million users.

== History ==
GreenPal was founded in April 2012 by Bryan M. Clayton, Gene Caballero, Zach Hendrix, and Ross Brooks. Clayton, Caballero, and Hendrix had previously worked together in the landscaping industry, and they noticed that the demand for same-day lawncare was growing.

Clayton cited Uber and Airbnb as his inspirations for the company. In order to encourage brand loyalty, GreenPal began offering complimentary treats and customized notes for homeowners with pets.

In 2016, three of the founders needed to obtain a $250,000 loan and personally guarantee it to buy out a fourth founder who was going through a divorce. Using the company's earnings, they settled the loan in about 18 months. From 2016 to 2017, GreenPal expanded its operations, and launched in several new cities such as Atlanta, Houston, and Marietta. According to Naples Daily News, the company generated nearly $5 million in revenue in 2017.

In 2019, GreenPal extended its operations to cities such as Minneapolis–Saint Paul, Detroit, San Diego, and Spokane, Washington.

In January 2020, the app was used by a reported 150,000 vendors and 1 million homeowners. That same month, the company expanded its snow removal service to Greater Boston. GreenPal has been cited as an example of economic "vaporization", wherein physical products can be replaced by information technologies. The introduction of apps like GreenPal has reduced the need for homeowners to purchase landscaping equipment, much as Uber diminished the need for individuals to own cars.

== Features ==
GreenPal's app functions as a matchmaking service to connect professional landscapers with local homeowners. Users download the app and list their address, the types of landscaping work they would like and the date that they would like the work completed. Nearby landscapers, known as "vendors" on the platform, are then able to bid on the job, based on the customers' description and Google Earth images of their yards. GreenPal screens vendors to ensure that they have commercial landscaping equipment and references, and requires them to register with a valid social security number and bank account. Vendors are then rated based on user reviews.

In addition to work such as lawnmowing and gardening, GreenPal's vendors also offer seasonal services such as snow removal.

== Development ==
The company initially paid $90,000 to develop an app and website for the service. However, this app turned out to be unusable, and had been designed for use on traditional computers rather than mobile devices. Hendrix, the CTO, began studying software design and developed a new app for the company.

== See also ==
- E-lancing
- Gig worker
