= Rick Stockstill =

American football player and coach (born 1957)

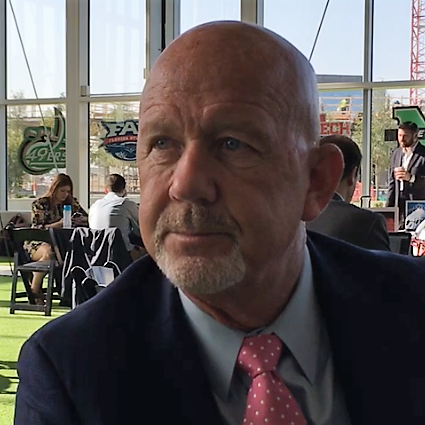
- Stockstill at 2018 C-USA Kickoff

Current position
- Title: Interim head coach
- Team: Florida State
- Conference: ACC
- Record: 2–1

Biographical details
- Born: December 23, 1957 (age 68); Sidney, Ohio, U.S.

Playing career
- 1977–1981: Florida State
- Position: Quarterback

Coaching career (HC unless noted)
- 1983–1984: Bethune–Cookman (OC/QB)
- 1985–1988: UCF (AHC/WR)
- 1989–1992: Clemson (QB)
- 1993: Clemson (PGC/QB)
- 1994–1995: Clemson (co-OC/WR)
- 1996–1998: Clemson (WR)
- 1999–2002: Clemson (WR/RC)
- 2003: East Carolina (OC/QB)
- 2004: South Carolina (WR/RC)
- 2005: South Carolina (TE/RC)
- 2006–2023: Middle Tennessee
- 2024–2026: Florida State (OA)
- 2026–present: Florida State (interim HC)

Head coaching record
- Overall: 115–112
- Bowls: 4–6

Accomplishments and honors

Championships
- 1 Sun Belt (2006); 1 C-USA East Division (2018)

Awards
- 2× Sun Belt Coach of the Year (2006, 2009); C-USA Coach of the Year (2018)

Richard Wilson Stockstill (born December 23, 1957) is an American college football coach. He is currently the interim head coach for Florida State University, his alma mater, following the firing of Mike Norvell on November 1, 2026. He was the head coach at Middle Tennessee from 2006 to 2023. Stockstill was a Florida State quarterback under coach Bobby Bowden from 1977 to 1981.

== Early life ==
Stockstill was born in Sidney, Ohio, on December 23, 1957. However, he grew up in Georgetown, KY and moved to Fernandina Beach, Florida, for his senior year of high school. He was inducted into the Fernandina Hall of Fame in 2006. He attended Florida State University and was a three-year letterman there as a quarterback where he was team captain.

== Coaching career ==
Stockstill served as an assistant at numerous locations for 24 years prior to getting his first head coaching job. He began at Bethune–Cookman University as an offensive coordinator and later went on to coach wide receivers at the University of Central Florida. For the 1989 season, Stockstill began a long stint as a wide receivers and quarterbacks coach with the Clemson Tigers, where he stayed until 2002. He served under coaches Danny Ford, Ken Hatfield, Tommy West and Tommy Bowden while at Clemson. Stockstill also worked under coaches Lou Holtz and Steve Spurrier at South Carolina after working one season for East Carolina University as an offensive coordinator.

=== Middle Tennessee ===
In 2006, Stockstill got his first head coaching job at Middle Tennessee State University in Murfreesboro. In his first season, Stockstill led the Blue Raiders to the program's second bowl game as well as a share of the Sun Belt Conference title. He was later that year named the conference coach of the year. The 2007 and 2008 seasons saw the Blue Raiders take a small step back with back-to-back 5–7 seasons. However, in 2009, Stockstill and the Blue Raiders went 10–3 and won the New Orleans Bowl, which was the second bowl victory in school history. Again, Stockstill was named conference coach of the year for the 2009 season. The Blue Raiders went to another bowl in 2010, and they finished the season 6–7 after losing the GoDaddy.com Bowl.

After the successful 2009 season, he turned down several offers from other schools, including Conference USA's East Carolina and Memphis, citing that it was not the right time to leave the Blue Raiders. Stockstill led MTSU to ten bowl games in 18 years, winning 4.

In September 2022, Stockstill led MTSU to a win over the Miami Hurricanes, 45–31. On November 27, 2023, Stockstill was fired after his 18th season as head coach at Middle Tennessee.

Florida State hired Stockstill as director of scouting in January 2024. Stockstill became interim head coach on November 1, 2026, after Florida State fired Mike Norvell.

== Personal life ==
Stockstill and his wife, the former Sara Fleischman, have a son, Brent, and a daughter, Emily. His son Brent was awarded a scholarship to play football at the University of Cincinnati beginning in the fall of 2013 but was released to play under his father at MTSU. Brent was the Blue Raiders' primary quarterback for the 2015 through 2018 seasons, culminating with an appearance in the 2018 New Orleans Bowl.

== Head coaching record ==
Year	Team	Overall	Conference	Standing	Bowl/playoffs
Middle Tennessee Blue Raiders (Sun Belt Conference) (2006–2012)
2006	Middle Tennessee	7–6	6–1	T–1st	L Motor City
2007	Middle Tennessee	5–7	4–3	T–2nd	
2008	Middle Tennessee	5–7	3–4	T–4th	
2009	Middle Tennessee	10–3	7–1	2nd	W New Orleans
2010	Middle Tennessee	6–7	5–3	3rd	L GoDaddy.com
2011	Middle Tennessee	2–10	1–7	8th	
2012	Middle Tennessee	8–4	6–2	T–2nd	
Middle Tennessee Blue Raiders (Conference USA) (2013–2023)
2013	Middle Tennessee	8–5	6–2	T–2nd (East)	L Armed Forces
2014	Middle Tennessee	6–6	5–3	2nd (East)	
2015	Middle Tennessee	7–6	6–2	T–2nd (East)	L Bahamas
2016	Middle Tennessee	8–5	5–3	3rd (East)	L Hawaii
2017	Middle Tennessee	7–6	4–4	T–3rd (East)	W Camellia
2018	Middle Tennessee	8–6	7–1	1st (East)	L New Orleans
2019	Middle Tennessee	4–8	3–5	T–5th (East)	
2020	Middle Tennessee	3–6	3–4	5th (East)	
2021	Middle Tennessee	7–6	4–4	4th (East)	W Bahamas
2022	Middle Tennessee	8–5	4–4	T–4th	W Hawaii
2023	Middle Tennessee	4–8	3–5	5th	
Middle Tennessee:		113–111	82–58		
Florida State Seminoles (Atlantic Coast Conference) (2026–present)
2026	Florida State	2–1 (Note: Stockstill was named interim head coach after Mike Norvell was fired after eight games.)	2–1		
Florida State:		2–1	2–1		
Total:		115–112			
National championship Conference title Conference division title or championship game berth
