= 2007 Middle Tennessee Blue Raiders football team =

American college football season

2007 Middle Tennessee Blue Raiders football
- Conference: Sun Belt Conference
- Record: 5–7 (4–3 Sun Belt)
- Head coach: Rick Stockstill (2nd season)
- Offensive coordinator: G. A. Mangus (2nd season)
- Offensive scheme: Multiple
- Defensive coordinator: Manny Diaz (2nd season)
- Base defense: 4–3
- Home stadium: Johnny "Red" Floyd Stadium

2007 Sun Belt Conference football standings
	Conf.			Overall
Team	W		L	W		L
Florida Atlantic +	6	–	1	8	–	5
Troy +	6	–	1	8	–	4
Middle Tennessee	4	–	3	5	–	7
Louisiana–Monroe	4	–	3	6	–	6
Arkansas State	3	–	4	5	–	7
Louisiana–Lafayette	3	–	4	3	–	9
FIU	1	–	6	1	–	11
North Texas	1	–	6	2	–	10
+ – Conference co-champions

The 2007 Middle Tennessee Blue Raiders football team represented Middle Tennessee State University as a member of the Sun Belt Conference during the 2007 NCAA Division I FBS football season. Led by second-year head coach Rick Stockstill, the Blue Raiders compiled an overall record of 5–7 with a mark of 4–3 in conference play, tying for third place in the Sun Belt. The team played home games at Johnny "Red" Floyd Stadium in Murfreesboro, Tennessee.

== Schedule ==
Date	Time	Opponent	Site	TV	Result	Attendance
September 1	3:00 p.m.	at Florida Atlantic	Lockhart Stadium; Fort Lauderdale, FL		L 14–27	11,398
September 8	6:00 p.m.	at No. 8 Louisville*	Papa John's Cardinal Stadium; Louisville, KY	ESPN2	L 42–58	40,882
September 15	7:00 p.m.	at No. 2 LSU*	Tiger Stadium; Baton Rouge, LA	GamePlan	L 0–44	92,407
September 20	6:00 p.m.	Western Kentucky*	Johnny "Red" Floyd Stadium; Murfreesboro, TN (rivalry)	ESPN+/CSS	L 17–20	22,086
September 29	6:00 p.m.	FIU	Johnny "Red" Floyd Stadium; Murfreesboro, TN		W 47–6	15,605
October 6	6:00 p.m.	Virginia*	Johnny "Red" Floyd Stadium; Murfreesboro, TN	CSS	L 21–23	23,227
October 13	7:00 p.m.	at Memphis*	Liberty Bowl Memorial Stadium; Memphis, TN		W 21–7	30,101
October 20	2:30 p.m.	Arkansas State	Johnny "Red" Floyd Stadium; Murfreesboro, TN		W 27–7	12,505
October 27	6:00 p.m.	at North Texas	Fouts Field; Denton, TX		W 48–28	18,181
November 3	6:00 p.m.	at Louisiana–Monroe	Malone Stadium; Monroe, LA		W 43–40	10,228
November 10	2:30 p.m.	Louisiana–Lafayette^{†}	Johnny "Red" Floyd Stadium; Murfreesboro, TN		L 24–34	19,227
November 20	6:00 p.m.	at Troy	Movie Gallery Stadium; Troy, AL (Battle for the Palladium)	ESPN2	L 7–45	18,242
*Non-conference game; ^{†}Homecoming; Rankings from AP Poll released prior to the game; All times are in Central time

== Game summaries ==
=== Florida Atlantic ===
	1	2	3	4	Total
Middle Tennessee	0	0	0	14	14
Florida Atlantic	7	3	7	10	27

=== Louisville ===
	1	2	3	4	Total
Middle Tennessee	21	14	0	7	42
Louisville	28	10	13	7	58

=== LSU ===
	1	2	3	4	Total
Middle Tennessee	0	0	0	0	0
LSU	10	13	21	0	44

=== WKU ===
	1	2	3	4	Total
WKU	0	10	3	7	20
Middle Tennessee	3	7	7	0	17

=== FIU ===
	1	2	3	4	Total
Florida International	0	0	0	6	6
Middle Tennessee	21	26	0	0	47

=== Virginia ===
	1	2	3	4	Total
Virginia	7	7	0	9	23
Middle Tennessee	7	7	0	7	21

=== Memphis ===
	1	2	3	4	Total
Middle Tennessee	7	0	7	7	21
Memphis	7	0	0	0	7

=== Arkansas State ===
	1	2	3	4	Total
Arkansas State	0	7	0	0	7
Middle Tennessee	14	10	0	0	24

=== North Texas ===
	1	2	3	4	Total
Middle Tennessee	10	20	7	11	48
North Texas	7	14	7	0	28

=== Louisiana–Monroe ===
	1	2	3	4	Total
Middle Tennessee	10	14	6	13	43
UL – Monroe	7	19	7	7	40

=== Louisiana–Lafayette ===
	1	2	3	4	Total
UL – Layfayette	0	14	7	13	34
Middle Tennessee	7	14	3	0	24

=== Troy ===
	1	2	3	4	Total
Middle Tennessee	7	0	0	0	7
Troy	10	14	14	7	45

== After the season ==
=== NFL draft ===
The following Blue Raider was selected in the 2008 NFL draft following the season.

Round	Pick	Player	Position	NFL club
6	167	Erik Walden	Defensive end	Dallas Cowboys
