= 2019 Middle Tennessee Blue Raiders football team =

American college football season

2019 Middle Tennessee Blue Raiders football
- Conference: Conference USA
- East Division
- Record: 4–8 (3–5 C-USA)
- Head coach: Rick Stockstill (14th season)
- Offensive coordinator: Tony Franklin (4th season)
- Offensive scheme: Bear raid
- Defensive coordinator: Scott Shafer (3rd season)
- Base defense: Multiple 4–3
- Home stadium: Johnny "Red" Floyd Stadium

2019 Conference USA football standings
	Conf.			Overall
Team	W		L	W		L
East Division
Florida Atlantic xy$	7	–	1	11	–	3
Marshall	6	–	2	8	–	5
Western Kentucky	6	–	2	9	–	4
Charlotte	5	–	3	7	–	6
Middle Tennessee	3	–	5	4	–	8
FIU	3	–	5	6	–	7
Old Dominion	0	–	8	1	–	11
West Division
UAB xy	6	–	2	9	–	5
Louisiana Tech x	6	–	2	10	–	3
Southern Miss	5	–	3	7	–	6
North Texas	3	–	5	4	–	8
UTSA	3	–	5	4	–	8
Rice	3	–	5	3	–	9
UTEP	0	–	8	1	–	11
Championship: Florida Atlantic 49, UAB 6
$ – Conference champion; x – Division champion/co-champions; y – Championship game participant

The 2019 Middle Tennessee Blue Raiders football team represented Middle Tennessee State University as a member of the East Division of Conference USA (C-USA) during the 2019 NCAA Division I FBS football season. Led by 14th-year head coach Rick Stockstill, the Blue Raiders compiled an overall record of 4–8 with a mark of 3–5 in conference play, tying for fifth place in the C-USA's East Division. The team played home games at Johnny "Red" Floyd Stadium in Murfreesboro, Tennessee.

== Preseason ==
=== CUSA media poll ===
Conference USA released their preseason media poll on July 16, 2019, with the Blue Raiders predicted to finish in fourth place in the East Division.

== Schedule ==
Middle Tennessee announced its 2019 football schedule on January 10, 2019. The 2019 schedule consisted of six home and six away games.

Date	Time	Opponent	Site	TV	Result	Attendance
August 31	6:30 p.m.	at No. 7 Michigan*	Michigan Stadium; Ann Arbor, MI	BTN	L 21–40	110,811
September 7	6:00 p.m.	Tennessee State*	Johnny "Red" Floyd Stadium; Murfreesboro, TN	ESPN3	W 45–26	20,912
September 14	6:00 p.m.	Duke*	Johnny "Red" Floyd Stadium; Murfreesboro, TN	Stadium Facebook	L 18–41	19,852
September 28	11:00 a.m.	at No. 14 Iowa*	Kinnick Stadium; Iowa City, IA	ESPN2	L 3–48	63,706
October 5	2:30 p.m.	Marshall	Johnny "Red" Floyd Stadium; Murfreesboro, TN	CBSSN Facebook	W 24–13	15,023
October 12	3:00 p.m.	at Florida Atlantic	FAU Stadium; Boca Raton, FL	ESPN+	L 13–28	12,107
October 19	3:00 p.m.	at North Texas	Apogee Stadium; Denton, TX	Stadium	L 30–33	16,094
October 26	2:30 p.m.	FIU^{†}	Johnny "Red" Floyd Stadium; Murfreesboro, TN	NFLN	W 50–17	9,512
November 2	2:30 p.m.	at Charlotte	Jerry Richardson Stadium; Charlotte, NC	ESPN3	L 20–34	13,879
November 16	3:30 p.m.	Rice	Johnny "Red" Floyd Stadium; Murfreesboro, TN	ESPN+	L 28–31	10,411
November 23	3:30 p.m.	Old Dominion	Johnny "Red" Floyd Stadium; Murfreesboro, TN	ESPN3	W 38–17	9,806
November 30	1:00 p.m.	at Western Kentucky	Houchens Industries–L. T. Smith Stadium; Bowling Green, KY (100 Miles of Hate)	ESPN+	L 26–31	7,589
*Non-conference game; ^{†}Homecoming; Rankings from AP Poll released prior to the game; All times are in Central time

== Game summaries ==
=== At Michigan ===
	1	2	3	4	Total
Blue Raiders	7	7	0	7	21
No. 7 Wolverines	10	17	6	7	40

=== Tennessee State ===
	1	2	3	4	Total
Tigers	6	0	13	7	26
Blue Raiders	0	10	14	21	45

=== Duke ===
	1	2	3	4	Total
Blue Devils	14	17	10	0	41
Blue Raiders	3	0	8	7	18

=== At Iowa ===
	1	2	3	4	Total
Blue Raiders	0	0	3	0	3
No. 14 Hawkeyes	17	7	10	14	48

=== Marshall ===
	1	2	3	4	Total
Thundering Herd	7	6	0	0	13
Blue Raiders	10	7	0	7	24

=== At Florida Atlantic ===
	1	2	3	4	Total
Blue Raiders	6	7	0	0	13
Owls	2	10	10	6	28

=== At North Texas ===
	1	2	3	4	Total
Blue Raiders	3	13	0	14	30
Mean Green	7	10	3	13	33

=== FIU ===
	1	2	3	4	Total
Panthers	7	10	0	0	17
Blue Raiders	14	0	23	13	50

=== At Charlotte ===
	1	2	3	4	Total
Blue Raiders	7	0	6	7	20
49ers	14	10	10	0	34

=== Rice ===
	1	2	3	4	Total
Owls	10	21	0	0	31
Blue Raiders	0	14	7	7	28

=== Old Dominion ===
	1	2	3	4	Total
Monarchs	7	3	7	0	17
Blue Raiders	14	14	7	3	38

=== At Western Kentucky ===
	1	2	3	4	Total
Blue Raiders	3	10	0	13	26
Hilltoppers	3	7	7	14	31
