= Phillip Tanner =

American football player (born 1988)

No. 34, 48, 39
- Position: Running back

Personal information
- Born: August 8, 1988 (age 38); Dallas, Texas, U.S.
- Listed height: 5 ft 10 in (1.78 m)
- Listed weight: 208 lb (94 kg)

Career information
- High school: Justin F. Kimball (Dallas)
- College: Middle Tennessee State
- NFL draft: 2011: undrafted

Career history
- Dallas Cowboys (2011–2013); Indianapolis Colts (2014)*; Dallas Cowboys (2014)*; Buffalo Bills (2014); San Francisco 49ers (2014)
- * Offseason or practice squad member only

Awards and highlights
- Second-team All-Sun Belt (2010)

Career NFL statistics
- Games played: 41
- Rushing yards: 149
- Rushing average: 2.7
- Rushing touchdowns: 2
- Receptions: 9
- Receiving yards: 93
- Stats at Pro Football Reference

Phillip Tanner (born August 8, 1988) is an American former professional football player who was a running back in the National Football League (NFL) for the Dallas Cowboys, Buffalo Bills, and San Francisco 49ers. He played college football for the Middle Tennessee Blue Raiders.

== Early life ==
Tanner attended Justin F. Kimball High School, where, as a junior he was named All-district after posting 1,395 rushing yards and 22 touchdowns.

As a senior, he rushed for 1,705 yards and scored 29 touchdowns, on his way to being named All-district and District Player of the Year. He finished his high school career with 4,275 rushing yards and 76 touchdowns. He also lettered in track competing in the 100 metres.

== College career ==
Tanner accepted a football scholarship from Middle Tennessee State University. As a true freshman, he played 13 games as a defensive back in nickel situations, tallying 16 tackles and one sack. He also practiced track, competing in the 4 × 100 metres relay team.

As a sophomore, he was switched to running back, playing in nine games (one start), while recording 64 carries for 299 yards and 4 touchdowns.

As a junior, he played in 12 games (4 starts), leading the team in rushing yards (714) and rushing touchdowns (15), while also becoming the first player in Sun Belt Conference history to receive both Offensive and Special Teams Player of the Week awards in the same week.

Tanner became a full-time starter as a senior, but was forced to redshirt after starting two games, because of a bone contusion he suffered in his knee during the second contest of the season. He started 2 games and rushed for 83 yards.

As a redshirt senior in 2010, he recorded 13 starts, 160 carries for 928 yards (led the team), a 5.8-yard average, 21 receptions for 194 yards and 13 touchdowns. He finished his collegiate career with 430 carries for 2,024 yards (4.7-yard avg.) and 33 touchdowns. He also lettered in track.

== Professional career ==
=== Dallas Cowboys ===
Tanner was signed as an undrafted free agent by the Dallas Cowboys after the 2011 NFL draft. On August 21, playing against the San Diego Chargers at Cowboys Stadium, he lost his helmet while scoring a touchdown in the second half of the game. A new rule canceled the touchdown, because it states that if any player loses his helmet while receiving, running, or intercepting a football, the play will end once the helmet has hit the field. He would end up making the team over running back Alonzo Coleman. He recorded his first professional carry and touchdown on October 23, against the St. Louis Rams. On December 9, he was placed on injured reserve with a hamstring injury.

In 2012, he was the third-string running back, registering 25 carries for 61 yards, one touchdown and 9 special teams tackles (sixth on the team). In 2013, he was the third-string running back, registering 9 carries for 12 yards, one touchdown and 9 special teams tackles (fifth on the team).

On February 23, 2014, after he was set to count $1.389 million against the salary cap, the Cowboys did not offer a restricted free agent tender, making him a free agent. During his time with the team, he mainly played on special teams, while registering 56 carries for 149 yards and 2 touchdowns as a backup running back.

=== Indianapolis Colts ===
On July 29, 2014, Tanner was signed by the Indianapolis Colts as a free agent, after releasing running back Chris Rainey. He was cut on August 20.

=== Dallas Cowboys (second stint) ===
On August 27, 2014, he was signed as a free agent by the Dallas Cowboys to play in the last game of the preseason, because of injuries at the running back position. He was released on August 30.

=== Buffalo Bills ===
On October 21, 2014, Tanner was signed by the Buffalo Bills after injuries to Fred Jackson and C. J. Spiller. He was cut on November 20, to make room for tight end MarQueis Gray.

=== San Francisco 49ers ===
On December 17, 2014, he was signed as a free agent by the San Francisco 49ers. He wasn't re-signed at the end of the year, after playing in the final two games mainly on special teams.

== Personal life ==
In 2019, Tanner entered the coaching ranks, serving as a special teams assistant coach for the Dallas Cowboys, his original NFL team. In March 2020, he joined former Cowboys teammate Jon Kitna's coaching staff at Burleson High School.
