= Dwone Hicks =

American football player (born 1981)

No. 28
- Position: Running back

Personal information
- Born: April 25, 1981 (age 45); Huntsville, Alabama, U.S.
- Listed height: 5 ft 10 in (1.78 m)
- Listed weight: 222 lb (101 kg)

Career information
- High school: Lee (Huntsville)
- College: Middle Tennessee (1999–2002)
- NFL draft: 2003: undrafted

Career history
- Tennessee Titans (2003); Chicago Bears (2003–2005)*
- * Offseason or practice squad member only

Awards and highlights
- Sun Belt Offensive Player of the Year (2001); First-team All-Sun Belt (2001); Second-team All-Sun Belt (2002)

Career NFL statistics
- Games played: 3
- Tackles: 2
- Stats at Pro Football Reference

Kenneth Dwone Hicks (born April 25, 1981) is an American former professional football player who was a running back in the National Football League (NFL). He played college football for the Middle Tennessee Blue Raiders and was signed by the Tennessee Titans as an undrafted free agent in after the 2003 NFL draft. He was also a member of the Chicago Bears.

== Early life ==
Hicks played football at Washingtonville High School in Washingtonville, New York, for a short time in 1996. He set that school's single-game rushing record (27 carries for 391 yards). Hicks transferred to Lee High School in Huntsville, where he was named the Alabama Class 6A State Player of the Year, after rushing for 2,226 yards and 21 touchdowns.

== College career ==
Hicks attended Middle Tennessee State University and was a three-year starter. As a junior, he was a first-team All-Sun Belt Conference selection after rushing for a conference leading 1,143 yards and a school-single season record and a conference leading 20 touchdowns.

== See also ==
- List of Division I FBS rushing touchdown leaders
