= 2016 Hawaii Bowl =

- 15th Hawaii Bowl
Hawaii Rainbow Warriors	Middle Tennessee Blue Raiders
(6-7)	(8-4)
Mountain West	C-USA
52	35
Head coach: Nick Rolovich	Head coach: Rick Stockstill
	1	2	3	4	Total
Hawaii	14	21	10	7	52
Middle Tennessee	14	7	7	7	35
- Date: December 24, 2016
- Season: 2016
- Stadium: Aloha Stadium
- Location: Honolulu, Hawaii
- MVP: Dru Brown (QB, Hawaii) & Richie James (WR, Middle Tennessee)
- Favorite: No Line
- Referee: Charles Lamertina (AAC)
- Attendance: 20,327
- Payout: US$650,000

United States TV coverage
- Network: ESPN/ESPN Radio
- Announcers: Chris Cotter, Mark May, Maria Taylor (TV); Kevin Winter, Mike Golic Jr (Radio)

The 2016 Hawaii Bowl was a post-season American college football bowl game played on December 24, 2016, at Aloha Stadium in Honolulu, Hawaii. The fifteenth edition of the Hawaii Bowl featured the Hawaii Rainbow Warriors from the Mountain West Conference against the Middle Tennessee Blue Raiders from Conference USA. It began at 3:15 p.m. HST and aired on ESPN. It was one of the 2016–17 bowl games that concluded the 2016 FBS football season.

== Teams ==
The game featured the Hawaii Rainbow Warriors with a record of 6–7 against the Middle Tennessee. This was the second time that the Hawaii Bowl featured a team with a losing record, after Fresno State in the 2014 Hawaii Bowl.

This was the second meeting between the schools; the first meeting was on September 5, 1993, where the Rainbow Warriors defeated the Blue Raiders by a score of 35–14.

=== Hawaii Rainbow Warriors ===
Hawaii, playing in their first bowl game since 2010, was the first Hawaii team to enter a bowl game with a losing record. The Rainbow Warriors, led by head coach Nick Rolovich, won the most league games since joining the MW in 2012, and had the most wins in a season since 2011. The Bows had lost three straight bowl games, including the 2008 BCS Sugar Bowl against Georgia, and had not won since a 41–24 Hawaii Bowl win over Arizona State in 2006, 10 years earlier.

=== Middle Tennessee Blue Raiders ===
Coached by Rick Stockstill, the Blue Raiders were bowl eligible for the sixth time since Stockstill took over in 2006, but MTSU hasn't won a bowl game since 2009, losing four straight bowl games in that span. The Blue Raiders also boasted the 12th best passing offense in the country, scoring 40.5 points a game.

== Game summary ==
Hawaii won their first bowl game since the 2006 Hawaii Bowl, exactly 10 years prior.

	1	2	3	4	Total
Rainbow Warriors	14	21	10	7	52
Blue Raiders	14	7	7	7	35

=== Scoring Summary ===
Scoring summary

Quarter	Time	Drive			Team	Scoring information	Score	
Quarter	Time	Plays	Yards	TOP	Team	Scoring information	MTSU	HAW
1	12:09	4	74	1:26	MTSU	I'Tavius Mathers 20-yard touchdown run, Canon Rooker kick good	0	7
1	9:46	2	70	0:45	MTSU	Richie James 51-yard touchdown reception from Brent Stockstill, Canon Rooker kick good	0	14
1	4:09	1	18	0:05	HAW	Metuisela 'Unga 18-yard touchdown reception from Dru Brown, Rigoberto Sanchez kick good	7	14
1	2:39	3	45	0:22	HAW	Steven Lakalaka 1-yard touchdown run, Rigoberto Sanchez kick good	14	14
2	11:43	8	80	4:01	HAW	Dru Brown 2-yard touchdown run, Rigoberto Sanchez kick good	21	14
2	7:30				HAW	Interception returned 68 yards for touchdown by Trayvon Henderson, Rigoberto Sanchez kick good	28	14
2	1:41	6	82	1:40	MTSU	Ty Lee 3-yard touchdown reception from Brent Stockstill, Canon Rooker kick good	28	21
2	0:22	5	55	1:13	HAW	Marcus Kemp 39-yard touchdown reception from Dru Brown, Rigoberto Sanchez kick good	35	21
3	9:46	8	53	3:32	HAW	23-yard field goal by Rigoberto Sanchez	38	21
3	7:51	7	75	1:55	MTSU	Dennis Andrews 10-yard touchdown reception from Brent Stockstill, Canon Rooker kick good	38	28
3	1:15	12	75	6:36	HAW	Metuisela 'Unga 12-yard touchdown reception from Dru Brown, Rigoberto Sanchez kick good	45	28
4	10:09	3	55	1:15	MTSU	Ty Lee 13-yard touchdown reception from Brent Stockstill, Canon Rooker kick good	45	35
4	3:31	11	84	6:33	HAW	Dylan Collie 4-yard touchdown reception from Dru Brown, Rigoberto Sanchez kick good	52	35
"TOP" = time of possession. For other American football terms, see Glossary of American football.							52	35

=== Statistics ===
Statistics	MTSU	HAW
First downs	29	18
Third down efficiency	4-11	8-15
Rushes-yards	24-123 (5.1)	42-206 (4.9)
Passing yards	420	296
Passing, Comp-Att-Int	29-50-2	20-30-0
Time of Possession	23:26	36:34
