= 2012 Middle Tennessee Blue Raiders football team =

American college football season

2012 Middle Tennessee Blue Raiders football
- Conference: Sun Belt Conference
- Record: 8–4 (6–2 Sun Belt)
- Head coach: Rick Stockstill (7th season)
- Offensive coordinator: Buster Faulkner (1st season)
- Offensive scheme: Pro spread
- Co-defensive coordinators: Steve Ellis (2nd season); Tyrone Nix (1st season)
- Base defense: 4–3
- Home stadium: Johnny "Red" Floyd Stadium

2012 Sun Belt Conference football standings
	Conf.			Overall
Team	W		L	W		L
Arkansas State $	7	–	1	10	–	3
Louisiana–Monroe	6	–	2	8	–	5
Middle Tennessee	6	–	2	8	–	4
Louisiana–Lafayette *	4	–	2	5	–	4
Western Kentucky	4	–	4	7	–	6
Troy	3	–	5	5	–	7
North Texas	3	–	5	4	–	8
Florida Atlantic	2	–	6	3	–	9
FIU	2	–	6	3	–	9
South Alabama **	1	–	7	2	–	11
$ – Conference champion; * – Louisiana–Lafayette vacated 4 wins due to NCAA violations. ** – South Alabama was ineligible for the conference title or a bowl game as part of their transition to the FBS.

The 2012 Middle Tennessee Blue Raiders football team represented Middle Tennessee State University as a member of Sun Belt Conference during the 2012 NCAA Division I FBS football season. Led by seventh-year head coach Rick Stockstill, the Blue Raiders compiled an overall record of 8–4 with a mark of 6–2 in conference play, placing in a three-way tie for second in the Sun Belt. Despite finishing two wins above bowl eligibility, Middle Tennessee was not invited to a bowl game.

The 2012 season was the Blue Raiders last in the Sun Belt. Middle Tennessee initially announced a move to Conference USA (C-USA) to take effect no later than July 2014 and later moved the conference change up to July 2013.

== During the offseason ==
Tyrone Nix was named co-defensive coordinator, along with Steve Ellis, and linebackers coach on February 22, 2012. Nix has led nationally ranked defenses at Southern Miss, South Carolina, and Ole Miss. Interim offensive coordinator, Buster Faulkner, was named offensive coordinator in February 2012. During the 2011 season Faulkner took over the play-calling duties the final seven games of the year following the resignation of Willie Simmons. Faulkner’s 2011 offense went on to record the fifth most yards of total offense, complete a record 299 passes, while becoming just the second offense in school history to amass over 3,000 passing yards.

== Schedule ==
Date	Time	Opponent	Site	TV	Result	Attendance
August 30	6:30 pm	McNeese State*	Johnny "Red" Floyd Stadium; Murfreesboro, TN	ESPN3	L 21–27	18,690
September 8	6:00 pm	Florida Atlantic	Johnny "Red" Floyd Stadium; Murfreesboro, TN	ESPN3	W 31–17	16,227
September 15	6:00 pm	at Memphis*	Liberty Bowl Memorial Stadium; Memphis, TN		W 48–30	27,113
September 29	12:00 pm	at Georgia Tech*	Bobby Dodd Stadium; Atlanta, GA	ACC RSN	W 49–28	39,270
October 6	2:30 pm	Louisiana–Monroe^{†}	Johnny "Red" Floyd Stadium; Murfreesboro, TN	SBN/CSS	L 17–31	21,067
October 13	5:00 pm	at FIU	FIU Stadium; Miami, FL		W 34–30	15,234
October 20	6:00 pm	at No. 15 Mississippi State*	Davis Wade Stadium; Starkville, MS	ESPN2	L 3–45	55,108
October 27	2:30 pm	North Texas	Johnny "Red" Floyd Stadium; Murfreesboro, TN	ESPN3	W 38–21	14,102
November 1	8:15 pm	at Western Kentucky	Houchens Industries–L. T. Smith Stadium; Bowling Green, KY (100 Miles of Hate)	ESPNU	W 34–29	17,327
November 17	2:30 pm	at South Alabama	Ladd–Peebles Stadium; Mobile, AL		W 20–12	15,087
November 24	2:30 pm	Troy	Johnny "Red" Floyd Stadium; Murfreesboro, TN (Battle for the Palladium)	ESPN3	W 24–21	18,605
December 1	2:00 pm	at Arkansas State	Liberty Bank Stadium; Jonesboro, AR		L 0–45	31,243
*Non-conference game; ^{†}Homecoming; Rankings from AP Poll released prior to the game; All times are in Central time

== Game summaries ==
=== McNeese State ===
	1	2	3	4	Total
Cowboys	0	14	10	3	27
Blue Raiders	3	3	0	15	21

=== Florida Atlantic ===
	1	2	3	4	Total
Owls	0	0	3	14	17
Blue Raiders	0	7	17	7	31

=== @ Memphis ===
	1	2	3	4	Total
Blue Raiders	7	20	14	7	48
Tigers	3	14	6	7	30

=== @ Georgia Tech ===
	1	2	3	4	Total
Blue Raiders	7	14	14	14	49
Yellow Jackets	7	14	0	7	28

=== Louisiana–Monroe ===
	1	2	3	4	Total
Warhawks	7	10	14	0	31
Blue Raiders	3	0	7	7	17

=== @ FIU ===
	1	2	3	4	Total
Blue Raiders	3	7	7	17	34
Panthers	6	14	3	7	30

=== @ Mississippi State ===
	1	2	3	4	Total
Blue Raiders	0	3	0	0	3
#16 Bulldogs	10	0	21	14	45

=== North Texas ===
	1	2	3	4	Total
Mean Green	0	0	14	7	21
Blue Raiders	17	7	14	0	38

=== @ WKU ===
	1	2	3	4	Total
Blue Raiders	10	7	7	10	34
Hilltoppers	7	10	7	5	29

=== @ South Alabama ===
	1	2	3	4	Total
Blue Raiders	7	3	7	3	20
Jaguars	3	3	6	0	12

=== Troy ===
	1	2	3	4	Total
Trojans	7	0	7	7	21
Blue Raiders	10	3	3	8	24

=== @ Arkansas State ===
	1	2	3	4	Total
Blue Raiders	0	0	0	0	0
Red Wolves	21	14	7	3	45
