= Kendall Newson =

American football player (born 1980)

No. 87, 82
- Position: Wide receiver

Personal information
- Born: March 5, 1980 (age 46); Decatur, Georgia, U.S.
- Listed height: 6 ft 1 in (1.85 m)
- Listed weight: 197 lb (89 kg)

Career information
- High school: Columbia (Decatur)
- College: Middle Tennessee
- NFL draft: 2002: 7th round, 222nd overall pick

Career history
- Jacksonville Jaguars (2002)*; Tennessee Titans (2002)*; Miami Dolphins (2003–2005); → Rhein Fire (2003); Hamilton Tiger-Cats (2007)*
- * Offseason or practice squad member only

Awards and highlights
- First-team All-Sun Belt (2001)

Career NFL statistics
- Receptions: 2
- Receiving yards: 55
- Average: 27.5
- Stats at Pro Football Reference

Kendall Montrae Newson (born March 5, 1980) is an American former professional football player who was a wide receiver for the Miami Dolphins of the National Football League (NFL). He was selected by the Jacksonville Jaguars in the seventh round of the 2002 NFL draft. He played college football for the Middle Tennessee Blue Raiders. Newson was also a member of the Tennessee Titans, Rhein Fire, and Hamilton Tiger-Cats. He later became a professional bass fisherman.

== Early life ==
Newson attended Columbia High School in Decatur, Georgia.

== College career ==
Newson played college football for the Middle Tennessee Blue Raiders from 1998 to 2001. He caught 30 passes his freshman year in 1998. He recorded 69 receptions for 918 yards and five touchdowns in 1999, 74 receptions for 945 yards and five touchdowns in 2000, and 65 receptions for 796 yards and seven touchdowns in 2001. Newson earned first-team All-Sun Belt honors in 2001.

He set school career records for receptions with 238 and receiving yards with 3,074. Newson played in the 2002 Hula Bowl after his senior season. He was inducted into the Blue Raider Sports Hall of Fame in 2020.

== Professional career ==
=== Jacksonville Jaguars ===
Newson was selected by the Jacksonville Jaguars in the seventh round, with the 222nd overall pick, of the 2002 NFL draft. He officially signed with the team on June 12, 2002. He was waived by the Jaguars on August 26, 2002.

=== Tennessee Titans ===
Newson was signed to the practice squad of the Tennessee Titans on September 3, 2002. He was released on September 10, 2002.

=== Miami Dolphins ===
Newson signed with the Miami Dolphins on March 3, 2003. He was allocated to NFL Europe in 2003 to play for the Rhein Fire. He started all 10 games for the Fire during the 2003 NFL Europe season, catching 26 passes for 437 yards and four touchdowns. Newson also returned 13 punts for 223 yards and one touchdown and 15 kicks for 430 yards and one touchdown.

He was waived by the Dolphins on August 31, 2003 and signed to the team's practice squad on September 2. He was promoted to the active roster on November 7. Newson was waived on December 20 but re-signed by the Dolphins on December 24, 2003. Overall, he played in six games during the 2003 season, recording two receptions for 55 yards. He also returned one punt for 0 yards and lost a fumble on the play. He was waived/injured on August 16, 2004 and reverted to injured reserve the next day. The next year, Newson was placed on injured reserve again on August 30, 2005.

=== Hamilton Tiger-Cats ===
Newson was signed by the Hamilton Tiger-Cats of the Canadian Football League on March 1, 2007. He was released on June 3, 2007.

== Fishing career ==
Newson was a professional bass fisherman from 2013 to 2019.
