= Don Griffin =

American football player (born 1964)

No. 29, 28
- Position: Cornerback

Personal information
- Born: March 17, 1964 (age 62); Pelham, Georgia, U.S.
- Listed height: 6 ft 0 in (1.83 m)
- Listed weight: 176 lb (80 kg)

Career information
- High school: Mitchell-Baker (Camilla, Georgia)
- College: Middle Tenn. State
- NFL draft: 1986: 6th round, 162nd overall pick

Career history
- San Francisco 49ers (1986–1993); Cleveland Browns (1994–1995); Philadelphia Eagles (1996)

Awards and highlights
- 2× Super Bowl champion (XXIII, XXIV)

Career NFL statistics
- Tackles: 482
- Interceptions: 25
- Fumble recoveries: 12
- Stats at Pro Football Reference

Donald Frederick Griffin (born March 17, 1964) is an American former professional football player who was a cornerback in the National Football League (NFL). He played college football for the Middle Tennessee Blue Raiders. Griffin was selected 162nd overall by the San Francisco 49ers in the sixth round of the 1986 NFL draft. His older brother James played in the NFL as a safety.

== Career ==
The San Francisco 49ers selected Griffin in the sixth round (162nd overall) of the 1986 NFL draft. Griffin was the 15th cornerback drafted and the second of two cornerbacks the 49ers drafted in 1986, along with third round pick (64th overall) Tim McKyer.

Griffin played in 11 NFL seasons from 1986 to 1996. A two-time Super Bowl winner with the 49ers in 1988 and 1989, Griffin also played with the Cleveland Browns from 1994 to 1995 and the Philadelphia Eagles in 1996.

The 49ers defense he was part of in 1987 allowed the fewest total yards (4,095/273 per game) and fewest passing yards (2,484/165.6 per game) of any NFL team.

The Browns defense he was part of in 1994 allowed the fewest points in the NFL (204/12.75 per game).

The only team with a losing record he played for was the 1995 Cleveland Browns (5–11).
