= Brent Stockstill =

American football player and coach (born 1994)

Indianapolis Colts
- Title: Offensive quality control coach

Personal information
- Born: August 5, 1994 (age 32); Clemson, South Carolina, U.S.

Career information
- High school: Siegel (Murfreesboro, Tennessee)
- College: Middle Tennessee (2013–2018)

Career history
- Florida Atlantic (2019) Player personnel assistant; South Florida (2020) Quarterbacks coach; Middle Tennessee (2021–2023); Wide receivers coach (2021); Quarterbacks coach & passing game coordinator (2022–2023); Indianapolis Colts (2024–present); Defensive analyst (2024–2025); Offensive quality control coach (2026–present)

Awards and highlights
- C-USA Most Valuable Player (2018); First-team All-Conference USA (2018); C-USA Freshman of the Year (2015)

Brent Forrest Stockstill (born August 5, 1994) is an American football coach and former player who currently serves as an offensive quality control coach for the Indianapolis Colts of the National Football League (NFL). A former quarterback at Middle Tennessee, he set multiple career program records including passing yards, touchdown passes, completed passes, and pass attempts. Stockstill had also obtained a reputation for being one of the toughest players in college football for his ability to play while being hindered by injuries.

== Early life ==
Stockstill was born in South Carolina to Rick and Sara Stockstill. Rick was an assistant coach at Clemson at the time. When Rick was an assistant coach, he would pull Brent out of school on Fridays to accompany him on recruiting trips and visits. He has a younger sister, Emily who attended the University of Alabama and worked for the university's football program. The Stockstills moved to Murfreesboro, Tennessee, in 2005 when Rick was named the head coach at Middle Tennessee State.

Stockstill played quarterback at Siegel High School in Tennessee where as a high school senior, he threw for 2,690 yards and 32 touchdowns. One of his notable games was where he threw for 373 yards and four touchdowns in a loss, despite tearing his ACL and partially tearing his meniscus the week prior. A two to three-star recruit, Stockstill committed to play college football at Cincinnati over offers from Texas Tech, Memphis, Western Michigan, and Toledo.

College recruiting
| Name | Hometown | School | Height | Weight | Commit date |
|---|---|---|---|---|---|
| Brent Stockstill; QB | Murfreesboro, Tennessee | Siegel High School | 6 ft 0 in (1.83 m) | 223 lb (101 kg) | Dec 17, 2012 |
| Brent Stockstill; QB | Recruit ratings: Scout: Rivals: 247Sports: (75) | | | | |
Overall recruit ranking:
Note: In many cases, Scout, Rivals, 247Sports, On3, and ESPN may conflict in their listings of height and weight.; In these cases, the average was taken. ESPN grades are on a 100-point scale.; Sources: "2013 Team Ranking". Rivals.com.

== College career ==
Initially committed to Cincinnati, Stockstill was granted a release from his national letter of intent to play for his father Rick at Middle Tennessee State. He also was a member of the school's baseball program, where he compiled a 1.69 ERA as a pitcher in 2014 and later redshirting to focus on football.

=== 2013 ===
Stockstill grayshirted the 2013 season and did not see any action.

=== 2014 ===
Stockstill played in the team's opening game against Savannah State, throwing for 41 yards. He did not play the rest of the season, and was granted a redshirt for the knee injury he suffered in high school.

=== 2015 ===
As a redshirt freshman, Stockstill competed in the offseason for the starting quarterback job against incumbent starter Austin Grammer. He was named the starting quarterback for the team's first game of the season against Jackson State. As a redshirt freshman, he set single-season program records for passing yards, passing touchdowns, passing completions and passing attempts en route to being named Conference USA's Freshman of the Year.

=== 2016 ===
Coming off a stellar freshman campaign, Stockstill was once again the starting quarterback entering the 2016 season. After throwing for 2,801 yards and 27 touchdowns in the first eight games, he suffered a broken collarbone against UTSA and was initially said to be out for the remainder of the season. He was cleared to return for the bowl game in the Hawaii Bowl against Hawaii, where he threw for 451 yards and four touchdowns in a loss.

=== 2017 ===
Stockstill once again suffered an injury in a game against Syracuse where he suffered a cracked sternum and injuries to his shoulder. He proceeded to miss the next six games before returning for the Blue Raiders game against UTEP. He finished the season with 1,672 passing yards, 16 touchdowns, and 8 interceptions.

=== 2018 ===
Stockstill played in all 14 of the Blue Raiders game in 2018, only leaving the game against FIU to a lower body injury. Stockstill had another career year with the Blue Raiders, throwing for 3,544 yards, 29 touchdowns, and 10 interceptions en route to being named to the Conference USA's Most Valuable Player.

=== College statistics ===
| Season | Team | GP | Passing | | | | | | | Rushing | | |
| Season | Team | GP | Cmp | Att | Pct | Yds | TD | Int | Rtg | Att | Yds | TD |
|---|---|---|---|---|---|---|---|---|---|---|---|---|
| 2014 | Middle Tennessee | 1 | 2 | 3 | 66.7 | 41 | 0 | 1 | 114.8 | 2 | -4 | 0 |
| 2015 | Middle Tennessee | 13 | 327 | 490 | 66.7 | 4,005 | 30 | 9 | 151.9 | 60 | 37 | 2 |
| 2016 | Middle Tennessee | 10 | 262 | 414 | 63.3 | 3,233 | 31 | 7 | 150.2 | 45 | 240 | 0 |
| 2017 | Middle Tennessee | 7 | 138 | 239 | 57.7 | 1,672 | 16 | 8 | 131.9 | 37 | 41 | 0 |
| 2018 | Middle Tennessee | 14 | 326 | 464 | 70.3 | 3,544 | 29 | 10 | 150.7 | 128 | 145 | 2 |
| Total | | 45 | 1,055 | 1,610 | 65.5 | 12,495 | 106 | 35 | 148.1 | 272 | 459 | 4 |

== Coaching career ==
Stockstill began his coaching career at Florida Atlantic under Lane Kiffin as an offensive player personnel assistant in 2019. He joined the coaching staff at South Florida under first-year head coach Jeff Scott as an offensive quality control analyst in 2020 after Kiffin left Florida Atlantic for Ole Miss.

Stockstill was named the wide receivers coach at his alma mater Middle Tennessee State on January 9, 2021. He was reassigned to quarterbacks coach and added the title of passing game coordinator in 2022.

Stockstill was not retained by Derek Mason following the 2023 season, and was later hired by Ole Miss as an offensive analyst. However, on May 18, 2024, Stockstill was hired by the Indianapolis Colts to serve as a defensive assistant. On February 23, 2026, Stockstill was promoted to the role of offensive quality control coach.
