= James Griffin (defensive back) =

American football player (born 1961)

No. 22, 34
- Position: Defensive back

Personal information
- Born: September 7, 1961 (age 65); Camilla, Georgia, U.S.
- Listed height: 6 ft 2 in (1.88 m)
- Listed weight: 197 lb (89 kg)

Career information
- College: Middle Tennessee State
- NFL draft: 1983: 7th round, 193rd overall pick

Career history
- Cincinnati Bengals (1983–1985); Detroit Lions (1986–1989); Kansas City Chiefs (1990)*
- * Offseason or practice squad member only

Career NFL statistics
- Interceptions: 19
- Fumble recoveries: 4
- Touchdowns: 3
- Stats at Pro Football Reference

James Victor Griffin (born September 7, 1961) is an American former professional football player who was a defensive back for seven seasons in the National Football League (NFL). He played college football for the Middle Tennessee Blue Raiders. His younger brother Don was a cornerback for the San Francisco 49ers. He was selected by the Cincinnati Bengals in the seventh round (193rd overall) of the 1983 NFL Draft.
