= Mike Moore (running back) =

American football player (1956–2016)

Michael Moore

Personal information
- Born: September 7, 1956; Chattanooga, Tennessee, U.S.
- Died: July 6, 2016 (aged 59); Nashville, Tennessee, U.S.

Career information
- High school: Brainerd (Chattanooga, Tennessee)
- College: Middle Tennessee State
- NFL draft: 1978: 12th round, 331st overall pick

Career history
- Miami Dolphins (1978)*; Houston Oilers (1978)*
- * Offseason or practice squad member only

Michael Moore (September 7, 1956 – July 6, 2016) was a collegiate football standout and native of Chattanooga, Tennessee.

He began his football legacy at Brainerd High School where he held numerous rushing records. He played his collegiate football with the Middle Tennessee State Blue Raiders where he again emerged as a standout running back earning both All Ohio Valley Conference and All-American honors in 1976.

Moore was selected in the 12th round of the 1978 NFL draft by the Miami Dolphins.

He played in pre-season NFL football games with the Houston Oilers alongside of Earl Campbell who was also drafted in the 1978 draft.

Moore is enshrined in the Chattanooga Sports Hall of Fame.

Moore was inducted into the MTSU Blue Raider Hall of Fame Class of 2007 and was a member of the Kappa Alpha Psi fraternity.
