= Erik Walden =

American football player (born 1985)

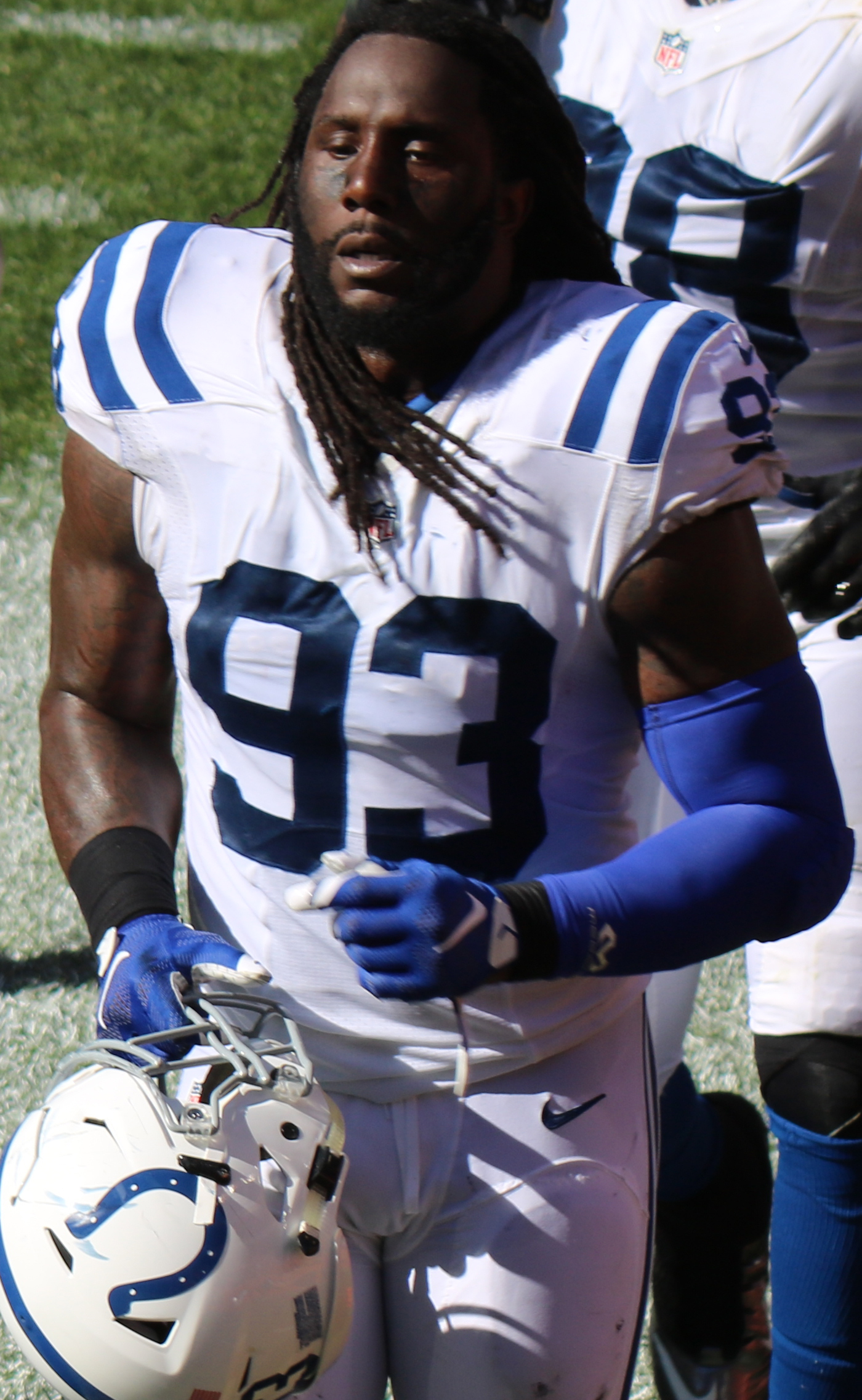
- Walden with the Indianapolis Colts in 2016

No. 93, 50, 52, 53
- Position: Linebacker

Personal information
- Born: August 21, 1985 (age 41); Dublin, Georgia, U.S.
- Listed height: 6 ft 2 in (1.88 m)
- Listed weight: 250 lb (113 kg)

Career information
- High school: Dublin
- College: Middle Tennessee State
- NFL draft: 2008: 6th round, 167th overall pick

Career history
- Dallas Cowboys (2008)*; Kansas City Chiefs (2008); Miami Dolphins (2008–2010); Green Bay Packers (2010–2012); Indianapolis Colts (2013–2016); Tennessee Titans (2017); Seattle Seahawks (2018)*
- * Offseason or practice squad member only

Awards and highlights
- Super Bowl champion (XLV); 2× All-Sun Belt (2006, 2007); MTSU Sports Hall of Fame

Career NFL statistics
- Total tackles: 356
- Sacks: 35.0
- Pass deflections: 10
- Interceptions: 2
- Forced fumbles: 7
- Defensive touchdowns: 1
- Stats at Pro Football Reference

Erik Lashawn Walden (born August 21, 1985) is an American former professional football player who was a linebacker in the National Football League (NFL). He played college football for the Middle Tennessee Blue Raiders and was selected by the Dallas Cowboys in the sixth round of the 2008 NFL draft. He was also a member of the Kansas City Chiefs, Miami Dolphins, Green Bay Packers, Indianapolis Colts, Tennessee Titans, and Seattle Seahawks. With the Packers, he won Super Bowl XLV in 2010.

== Early life ==
Walden attended Dublin High School where he practiced football, basketball, and track. In football, he played as a running back and defensive end. In basketball, he received All-state honors as a junior and senior.

He moved on to Middle Tennessee State University and became a four-year starter at defensive end. As a junior, he was an All-Sun Belt Conference selection. Against Central Michigan in the 2006 Motor City Bowl he led his team with six tackles and two quarterback sacks.

Walden was injured most of his senior season, which limited his effectiveness, but was still named All-Sun Belt, after finishing second in conference history in career sacks. He ended his college career after playing in 44 games (34 starts) with 152 tackles (40 for loss), 22.5 sacks, 5 forced fumbles, 2 fumble recoveries, 4 passes defensed and one interception. He owns the school's career (22.5) and season (11.5) sack records.

== Professional career ==
=== Dallas Cowboys ===
Walden was selected in the sixth round (167th overall) of the 2008 NFL draft by the Dallas Cowboys. He was waived on August 30 during final cuts.

=== Kansas City Chiefs ===
A day after being let go by the Cowboys, hoping he would clear waivers and enabling them to sign him to their practice squad, he was claimed off waivers by the Kansas City Chiefs on August 31, 2008. He played in 9 games, making 10 special teams tackles and was released on November 18.

=== Miami Dolphins ===
He was claimed off waivers by the Miami Dolphins on November 20, 2008. He played in 6 games and recorded 5 special teams tackles. The next year, he was inactive for 5 games and finished with 8 special teams tackles. He was waived on September 9, 2010.

=== Green Bay Packers ===
Walden was signed as a free agent by the Green Bay Packers on October 27, 2010, because they were experiencing several injuries on the defensive side. In just his second career start he had a breakout game and was named NFC Defensive Player of the week, after playing against the Chicago Bears, while leading the team with 16 tackles and 2 sacks. He was declared inactive in Super Bowl XLV because of an ankle injury, although he made an impact in each of the first three games of the Packers' championship run, including a forced fumble, two quarterback hits and nine tackles.

In 2011, he became a full-time starter (15 starts) for the first time in his career and posted 86 tackles (50 solo), 3 sacks, 2 passes defensed and a fumble recovery that he returned for his first career touchdown. The next year his starts were reduced to 9 games after the Packers drafted Nick Perry. He finished with 69 tackles (38 solo), 3 sacks, 4 passes defensed and his first 2 career interceptions.

=== Indianapolis Colts ===
On March 12, 2013, Walden signed a four year, $16 million contract with the Indianapolis Colts. In Week 11 against the Tennessee Titans, he pulled Delanie Walker's helmet off and head-butted him, which resulted in a penalty for unnecessary roughness and a one-game suspension. He finished the season with 15 starts, 58 tackles (33 solo), 3 sacks, 3 passes defensed, one forced fumble and one fumble recovery.

In 2014, Walden set a then career-high in sacks with 6, while also recording 57 tackles (40 solo) and one forced fumble in 15 games (14 starts). The next year, he started 15 games, posting 3 sacks and one forced fumble. The next year, he started 15 games at outside linebacker, posting 57 tackles (9 for loss), 3 sacks, one forced fumble and 12 quarterback hits.

In 2016, Walden started 16 games at outside linebacker and had a career year, setting a new career-high in sacks with 11, while making 42 tackles (9 for loss), 3 forced fumbles and 17 quarterback hits.

=== Tennessee Titans ===
On July 28, 2017, Walden signed with the Tennessee Titans. He was a backup at outside linebacker behind Brian Orakpo and Derrick Morgan. On September 17, 2017, in Week 2, Walden recovered a Blake Bortles fumble in a 37–16 victory over the Jacksonville Jaguars. Walden finished the 2017 season with 36 tackles, four sacks, and four tackles for loss. He wasn't re-signed after the season.

=== Seattle Seahawks ===
On August 17, 2018, Walden signed with the Seattle Seahawks. He was placed on injured reserve on September 1, 2018, and later released with an injury settlement.

== NFL career statistics ==
Legend
**Bold**	Career high

=== Regular season ===
Year	Team	Games		Tackles					Interceptions					Fumbles			
Year	Team	GP	GS	Cmb	Solo	Ast	Sck	TFL	Int	Yds	TD	Lng	PD	FF	FR	Yds	TD
2008	KAN	9	0	10	9	1	0.0	0	0	0	0	0	0	0	0	0	0
2008	MIA	6	0	5	4	1	0.0	0	0	0	0	0	0	0	0	0	0
2009	MIA	11	0	8	7	1	0.0	0	0	0	0	0	0	0	0	0	0
2010	MIA	2	0	0	0	0	0.0	0	0	0	0	0	0	0	0	0	0
2010	GNB	9	2	25	21	4	2.0	3	0	0	0	0	1	0	0	0	0
2011	GNB	**16**	15	**60**	**41**	**19**	3.0	6	0	0	0	0	2	1	**1**	5	**1**
2012	GNB	15	9	46	27	**19**	3.0	3	**2**	**22**	0	**20**	**4**	0	0	0	0
2013	IND	15	15	45	26	19	3.0	5	0	0	0	0	3	1	**1**	**10**	0
2014	IND	15	14	37	25	12	6.0	9	0	0	0	0	0	1	0	0	0
2015	IND	15	15	42	28	14	3.0	9	0	0	0	0	0	1	0	0	0
2016	IND	**16**	**16**	42	31	11	**11.0**	**10**	0	0	0	0	0	**3**	0	0	0
2017	TEN	**16**	2	36	25	11	4.0	5	0	0	0	0	0	0	**1**	0	0
		145	88	356	244	112	35.0	50	2	22	0	20	10	7	3	15	1

=== Playoffs ===
Year	Team	Games		Tackles					Interceptions					Fumbles			
Year	Team	GP	GS	Cmb	Solo	Ast	Sck	TFL	Int	Yds	TD	Lng	PD	FF	FR	Yds	TD
2008	MIA	1	0	0	0	0	0.0	0	0	0	0	0	0	0	0	0	0
2010	GNB	**3**	**3**	9	**9**	0	**1.0**	0	0	0	0	0	0	**1**	0	0	0
2011	GNB	1	0	1	1	0	0.0	0	0	0	0	0	0	0	0	0	0
2012	GNB	2	1	8	4	4	**1.0**	**3**	0	0	0	0	0	0	0	0	0
2013	IND	2	2	**11**	5	**6**	**1.0**	**3**	0	0	0	0	**1**	0	0	0	0
2014	IND	**3**	**3**	9	4	5	**1.0**	**3**	0	0	0	0	**1**	0	0	0	0
2017	TEN	2	0	4	3	1	0.0	0	0	0	0	0	0	0	0	0	0
		14	9	42	26	16	4.0	9	0	0	0	0	2	1	0	0	0

== Personal life ==
Walden has two children with an ex-girlfriend, Erica Palmer. On November 25, 2011, he was arrested for an alleged physical altercation that sent Palmer to the hospital. Police stated they had enough evidence to hold him under felony charges through Monday, as his case could not be processed over the Thanksgiving weekend. Charges were later dropped, and Walden was not suspended by the league.

On March 19, 2015, it was reported that Walden and an unnamed female companion had been attacked by Palmer. She allegedly confronted Walden at his Braselton, Georgia home with a gun and a baseball bat, and while he was able to take the gun from her, Palmer used the bat to break the arm of the unnamed woman. Palmer then fled, but returned to attack Walden, slashing his arm with a knife. Palmer was arrested and charged with two counts of aggravated assault, family violence aggravated assault, theft by taking, and first-degree burglary.

Walden was inducted into the Middle Tennessee State University Sports Hall of Fame in 2019.
