= Tyrone Calico =

American football player (born 1980)

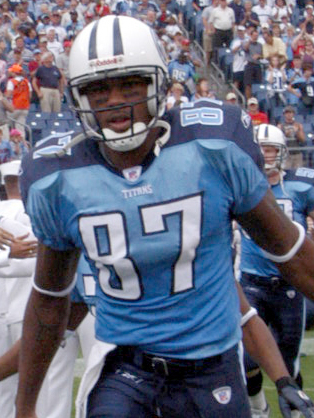
- Calico with the Tennessee Titans in 2003

No. 87
- Position: Wide receiver

Personal information
- Born: November 9, 1980 (age 45); Orange County, California, U.S.
- Listed height: 6 ft 4 in (1.93 m)
- Listed weight: 223 lb (101 kg)

Career information
- High school: Central (Millington, Tennessee)
- College: Middle Tennessee State
- NFL draft: 2003: 2nd round, 60th overall pick

Career history
- Tennessee Titans (2003–2005); Calgary Stampeders (2008)*
- * Offseason or practice squad member only

Awards and highlights
- Second-team All-Sun Belt (2002)

Career NFL statistics
- Receptions: 42
- Receiving yards: 501
- Receiving touchdowns: 4
- Stats at Pro Football Reference

Tyrone Bernard Calico (born November 9, 1980) is an American former professional football player who was a wide receiver in the National Football League (NFL). In college, he was the starting receiver for Middle Tennessee State University.

== College career ==
Calico made 65 receptions during his freshman season and finished third single season receptions in school history. As a sophomore, he had 47 catches for 752 yards with three touchdowns. On October 28, 2000, Calico caught three passes for 89-yards and two touchdowns during a 61–35 loss to Mississippi State. During the game, Calico made a one-handed 42-yard reception on the sideline as he was covered by three defenders including Fred Smoot. He was able to split the defenders and raced down the sideline for a touchdown. This catch was voted the best catch of the 2000 season and an old painting depicting the catch is hung in the college football hall of fame. As a junior, he had 37 catches for 583 yards with five touchdowns. He bounced back as a senior with 45 catches for 606 yards with four touchdowns.

== Professional career ==
=== Pre-draft ===
Calico accepted his invitation to the 2003 Senior Bowl and helped the North defeat the South 24–21. He attended the NFL Combine and was impressive after running the 40-yard dash in times ranging from 4.34 to 4.42. This greatly raised his draft stock and NFL analyst Gil Brandt projected him to be a first round pick in the upcoming draft, with the possibility of going to the Tennessee Titans at 28th overall. At the conclusion of the pre-draft process, the majority of scouts and NFL draft experts projected him to be a second round pick. He was ranked the seventh best wide receiver prospect in the draft by NFLDraftScout.com.

Pre-draft measurables
Height	Weight	Arm length	Hand span	40-yard dash	10-yard split	20-yard split	20-yard shuttle	Three-cone drill	Vertical jump	Broad jump
6 ft 3 in (1.91 m)	228 lb (103 kg)	34 3/8 in (0.87 m)	9 5/8 in (0.24 m)	4.42 s	1.63 s	2.62 s	4.26 s	6.73 s	38 in (0.97 m)	10 ft 7 in (3.23 m)
All values from NFL Combine

=== Tennessee Titans ===
The Tennessee Titans selected him in the second round (60th overall) of the 2003 NFL draft. He was the highest selection taken from Middle Tennessee State. Calico was also the 19th player ever drafted from Middle Tennessee State.

He recorded four touchdowns in his rookie season.

After a knee injury caused by an illegal horse-collar tackle from Roy Williams, he never recovered the same and was eventually cut by the Titans after 2005.

=== Calgary Stampeders ===
On May 13, 2008, he was signed by the Calgary Stampeders of the Canadian Football League. He was released on June 9, 2008.

In July, 2021, Calico was honored with a 99 Overall card in Madden NFL 21's online game mode Madden Ultimate Team.
