= Richie James =

American football player (born 1995)

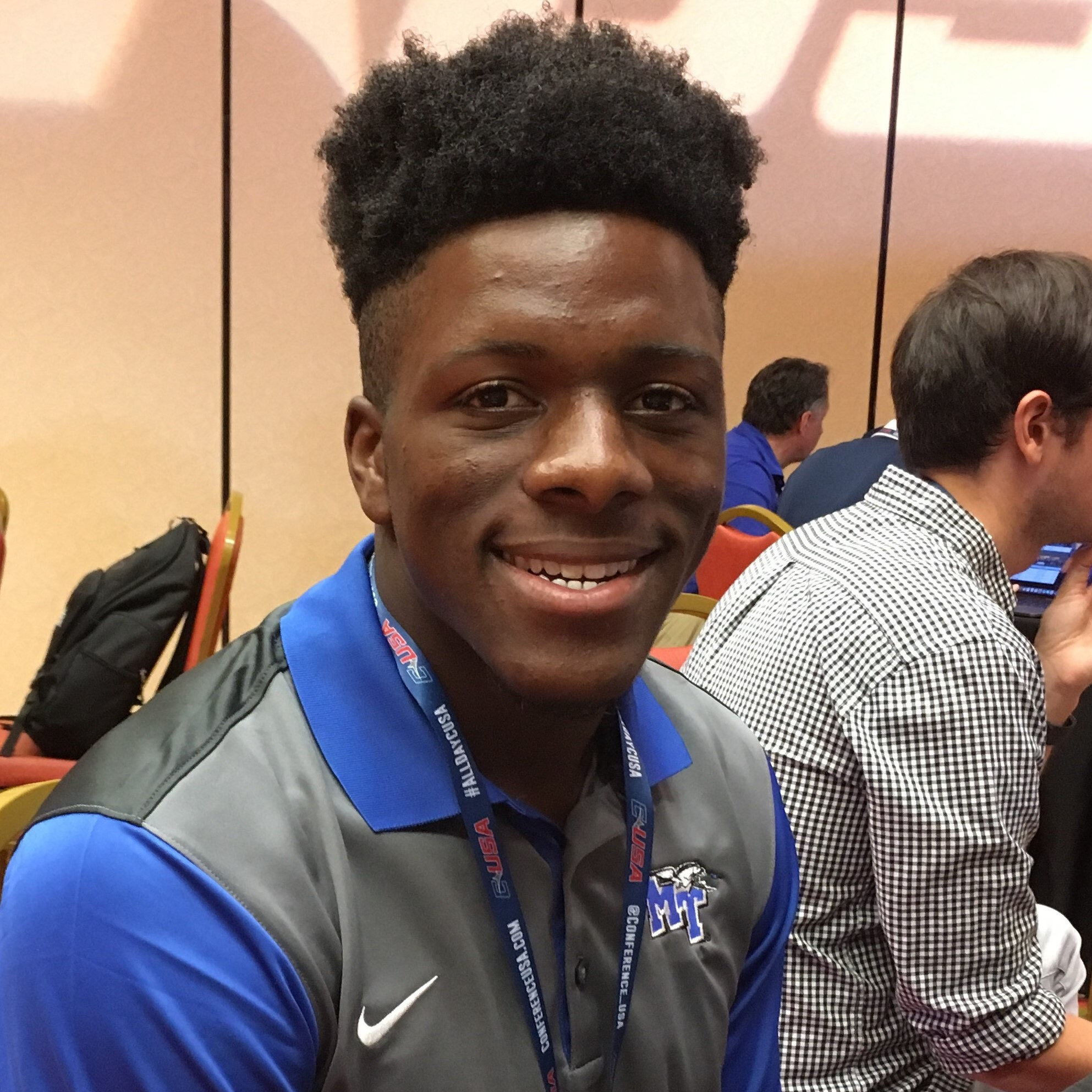
- James in 2017

No. 13, 80, 17
- Position: Wide receiver

Personal information
- Born: September 5, 1995 (age 31); Sarasota, Florida, U.S.
- Listed height: 5 ft 10 in (1.78 m)
- Listed weight: 184 lb (83 kg)

Career information
- High school: Riverview (Sarasota)
- College: Middle Tennessee (2014–2017)
- NFL draft: 2018: 7th round, 240th overall pick

Career history
- San Francisco 49ers (2018–2021); New York Giants (2022); Kansas City Chiefs (2023)

Awards and highlights
- Super Bowl champion (LVIII)

Career NFL statistics
- Receptions: 105
- Receiving yards: 1,372
- Return yards: 2,015
- Total touchdowns: 8
- Stats at Pro Football Reference

Richard Rhondel James Jr. (born September 5, 1995) is an American former professional football player who was a wide receiver and return specialist in the National Football League (NFL). He played college football for the Middle Tennessee Blue Raiders and was selected by the San Francisco 49ers in the seventh round of the 2018 NFL draft. He also played for the New York Giants and Kansas City Chiefs. With the Chiefs, he won Super Bowl LVIII.

== Early life ==
James attended Riverview High School in Sarasota, Florida. Along with playing football, he also participated and lettered in track, winning multiple state titles. James originally committed to play football for the Georgia Southern Eagles in December 2013, but decommitted after a coaching change. He then committed to play football for the Middle Tennessee Blue Raiders in January 2014 and signed in February 2014.

== College career ==
James did not play as a true freshman in 2014 and ended up choosing to redshirt.

As a redshirt freshman in 2015, James played in all 13 of Middle Tennessee's games, catching 108 passes for 1,346 yards and eight touchdowns. He also rushed for 146 yards and one touchdown on 12 attempts. He was named to the 2015 All-Conference USA (C-USA) First Team and the 2015 C-USA All-Freshman Team.

In 2016, James once again played in all 13 games, catching 105 passes for 1,625 yards, tallying 12 touchdowns, along with rushing for 339 yards and four touchdowns on 38 attempts. He was named to the 2016 C-USA All-Conference First Team.

As a redshirt junior in 2017, James played in five games, catching 31 passes for 290 yards and three touchdowns. However, he broke his collarbone against Marshall and was ruled out for the season. During his limited playing time in 2017, James became Middle Tennessee's career leader in receiving yards (3,261) and receiving touchdowns (23). After the season, James declared for the 2018 NFL draft.

=== College statistics ===
Year	School	G	Rec	Yds	Avg	TD
2015	MTSU	13	107	1,334	12.5	8
2016	MTSU	13	105	1,625	15.5	12
2017	MTSU	5	31	290	9.4	3
Career		31	243	3,249	13.4	23

== Professional career ==
Pre-draft measurables
Height	Weight	Arm length	Hand span	40-yard dash	10-yard split	20-yard split	20-yard shuttle	Three-cone drill	Vertical jump	Broad jump	Bench press
5 ft 9 in (1.75 m)	183 lb (83 kg)	31 1/4 in (0.79 m)	9 1/4 in (0.23 m)	4.48 s	1.56 s	2.62 s	4.16 s	6.87 s	35.5 in (0.90 m)	10 ft 2 in (3.10 m)	6 reps
All values from NFL Combine

=== San Francisco 49ers ===
James was selected by the San Francisco 49ers in the seventh round with the 240th overall pick in the 2018 NFL Draft.

During Week 5 against the Arizona Cardinals, he made his first NFL reception, which went for seven yards. During a Week 14 victory against the Seattle Seahawks, James scored his first NFL touchdown after returning a 97-yard kickoff return in the first quarter. In the regular-season finale against the Los Angeles Rams, he caught three passes for 32 yards and a touchdown.

James finished his rookie year with 655 return yards and a touchdown along with nine receptions for 130 yards and a touchdown.

James was placed on the reserve/COVID-19 list by the 49ers on July 27, 2020. He was activated from the reserve/COVID-19 list and subsequently placed on the active/non-football injury list eight days later. He was activated on September 3, 2020. He was placed on injured reserve on September 18, 2020, after suffering a hamstring injury in Week 1. He was designated to return from injured reserve on October 7, and began practicing with the team again. He was activated on October 17.

On November 5, 2020, on Thursday Night Football against the Green Bay Packers, James had nine receptions for 184 yards and a touchdown, which was higher than either of his season totals in 2018 and 2019. However the 49ers lost 34–17.

On August 28, 2021, James was waived/injured by the 49ers after undergoing knee surgery and was placed on injured reserve.

=== New York Giants ===
On March 25, 2022, James signed with the New York Giants. In Week 8 against the Seattle Seahawks James fumbled twice on 2 different punt returns. The second fumble came in the fourth quarter and cost the Giants any chance of making a comeback.

In the 2022 regular season, James accumulated 57 receptions for 569 yards and four touchdowns, contributing to the Giants' first playoff berth since 2016.

=== Kansas City Chiefs ===
James signed with the Kansas City Chiefs on April 11, 2023. He was placed on injured reserve on September 23. James was activated on November 18. He finished the 2023 season with 10 receptions for 114 yards. James played in Super Bowl LVIII, where the Chiefs beat his former team San Francisco 49ers 25–22.

On July 19, 2025, James retired from professional football, citing a knee injury that never healed properly.

== NFL career statistics ==
Legend
	Won the Super Bowl
**Bold**	Career best

Year	Team	Games		Receiving					Rushing					Returning					Fumbles	
Year	Team	GP	GS	Rec	Yds	Avg	Lng	TD	Att	Yds	Avg	Lng	TD	Ret	Yds	Avg	Lng	TD	Fum	Lost
2018	SF	13	2	9	130	14.4	53	1	0	0	0.0	0	0	35	655	**18.7**	**97T**	**1**	2	**1**
2019	SF	16	1	6	165	**27.5**	**57**	1	**2**	-1	-0.5	0	0	**53**	**692**	13.1	81	0	**1**	**1**
2020	SF	11	7	23	394	17.1	47	1	0	0	0.0	0	0	10	107	10.7	21	0	2	2
2022	NYG	17	4	**57**	**569**	10.0	33	**4**	**2**	**6**	**3.0**	**4**	0	24	174	7.6	21	0	3	2
2023	KC	9	1	10	114	11.4	45	0	0	0	0.0	0	0	29	387	13.3	31	0	2	**1**
Career		66	15	105	1,372	13.1	57	7	4	5	1.6	4	0	151	2,015	13.3	97T	1	10	6
