= 2016 Conference USA football season =

- League: NCAA Division I Football Bowl Subdivision
- Sport: Football
- Duration: September 1, 2016 through December 27, 2016
- Teams: 13
- TV partner(s): ESPN, CBS Sports Network, American Sports Network, beIN Sports, Campus Insiders, CUSA.tv

2017 NFL Draft
- Top draft pick: G Forrest Lamp, WKU
- Picked by: Los Angeles Chargers, 38th overall

Regular season
- Season MVP: QB Ryan Higgins, La. Tech
- East champions: Western Kentucky & Old Dominion (co-champions)
- West champions: Louisiana Tech

Championship Game
- Champions: Western Kentucky
- Runners-up: Louisiana Tech
- Finals MVP: RB Anthony Wales, WKU

Football seasons
- 2015 2017

2016 Conference USA football standings
	Conf.			Overall
Team	W		L	W		L
East Division
Western Kentucky xy$	7	–	1	11	–	3
Old Dominion x	7	–	1	10	–	3
Middle Tennessee	5	–	3	8	–	5
FIU	4	–	4	4	–	8
Charlotte	3	–	5	4	–	8
Marshall	2	–	6	3	–	9
Florida Atlantic	2	–	6	3	–	9
West Division
Louisiana Tech xy	6	–	2	9	–	5
UTSA	5	–	3	6	–	7
Southern Miss	4	–	4	7	–	6
North Texas	3	–	5	5	–	8
Rice	2	–	6	3	–	9
UTEP	2	–	6	4	–	8
Championship: Western Kentucky 58, Louisiana Tech 44
$ – Conference champion; x – Division champion/co-champions; y – Championship game participant; Rankings from AP Poll

The 2016 Conference USA football season was the 21st season of Conference USA football and part of the 2016 NCAA Division I FBS football season. The season began on September 1 with Charlotte facing Louisville. This season was the second season for the C-USA under realignment that took place in 2014, which added the 14th member Charlotte from the Atlantic 10 Conference. The C-USA is a "Group of Five" conference under the College Football Playoff format along with the American Athletic Conference, the Mid-American Conference, the Mountain West Conference, and the Sun Belt Conference.

C-USA consists of 14 members: Charlotte, FIU, Florida Atlantic, Louisiana Tech, Marshall, Middle Tennessee, North Texas, Old Dominion, Rice, Southern Miss, UAB, UTEP, UTSA, and Western Kentucky; and is split up into the East and West divisions. West champion Louisiana Tech played at East champion Western Kentucky's Houchens Industries-L. T. Smith Stadium for the Conference USA Championship on December 3, which Western Kentucky won 58–44. UAB continued to undergo reinstatement of its football program during the 2016 season and will begin play for the 2017 season.

Western Kentucky entered the season as defending Conference USA champions, defeating Southern Miss in the previous year's championship game. The Hilltoppers would then go on to defeat South Florida in the Miami Beach Bowl 45–35.

== Preseason ==
=== 2016 predictions ===
The 2016 preseason media predictions were released on July 21, 2016, with the vote conducted by media members that cover the conference schools. Middle Tennessee was picked to win the East division for the first time in school history. After coming second in the East last year, which resulted a trip to the Bahamas Bowl, the Blue Raiders returned 13 starters for the upcoming season. In the West division, the media predicted Southern Miss to overcome the other 5 teams in the division. Southern Miss has been in the C-USA championship more than any team in the conference, with 3 appearances including an appearance last season against Western Kentucky. The Golden Eagles brought back seven starters on offense and six starters on defense. Western Kentucky, defending C-USA champion, was predicted to finish second in the East division, instead of returning to the title game.

The championship game was held on December 3, 2016, where the Western Kentucky Hilltoppers bested the Louisiana Tech Bulldogs 58–44.

West Division

1. Southern Miss
2. Louisiana Tech
3. Rice
4. UTEP
5. UTSA
6. North Texas

East Division

1. Middle Tennessee
2. WKU
3. Marshall
4. Florida Atlantic
5. FIU
6. Old Dominion
7. Charlotte

== Head coaches ==
Three Conference USA teams hired new head coaches for the 2016 season. All three were in the West Division, and all three were replacing coaches who had spent at least 3 seasons at their respective schools.

- North Texas hired Seth Littrell to replace Dan McCarney, who was fired after the Mean Green lost to Portland State on October 10, 2015. Mike Canales was promoted as interim head coach after the fire until the hire of Littrell. Seth is coming from being an assistant head coach for offense and tight ends coach at North Carolina. Littrell was hired on December 5, 2015.
- Southern Miss hired Jay Hopson to replace Todd Monken, who resigned to become the new Offensive Coordinator for the Tampa Bay Buccaneers after the 2015 season. Jay spent has spent four years prior to Southern Miss at Alcorn State and help bring the Braves to two SWAC Championship Titles. Hopson was hired on January 30, 2016.
- UTSA hired Frank Wilson to replace Larry Coker, who resigned on January 5, 2016. Wilson is come from being a running backs coach and a recruiting coordinator at LSU for 7 seasons. Frank was hired on January 14, 2016.

Note: All stats shown are before the beginning of the season.

Team	Head coach	Years at school	Overall record	Record at school	CUSA record
Charlotte	Brad Lambert	4	12–22	12–22	0–8
FIU	Ron Turner	4	55–82	10–26	7–17
Florida Atlantic	Charlie Partridge	3	6–18	6–18	5–11
Louisiana Tech	Skip Holtz	4	110–88	22–17	16–8
Marshall	Doc Holliday	7	50–28	50–28	33–15
Middle Tennessee	Rick Stockstill	11	64–61	64–61	17–7
North Texas	Seth Littrell	1	0–0	0–0	0–0
Old Dominion	Bobby Wilder	8	57–27	57–27	7–9
Rice	David Bailiff	10	74–75	53–60	37–35
Southern Miss	Jay Hopson	1	32–17	0–0	0–0
UTEP	Sean Kugler	4	14–23	14–23	9–15
UTSA	Frank Wilson	1	0–0	0–0	0–0
Western Kentucky	Jeff Brohm	3	20–7	20–7	12–4

== C-USA vs other conferences ==
=== C-USA vs power conferences ===
Index to colors and formatting
Conference USA member won
Conference USA member lost
Conference USA teams in **bold**

This is a list of the power conference teams (ACC, Big Ten, Big 12, Pac-12, SEC) C-USA plays in non-conference (Rankings from the AP Poll):

Date	Visitor	Home	Site	Score
September 1	**Charlotte**	#19 Louisville	Papa John's Cardinal Stadium • Louisville, Kentucky	14–70
September 1	Indiana	**FIU**	FIU Stadium • Miami	34–13
September 3	**Louisiana Tech**	Arkansas	Donald W. Reynolds Razorback Stadium • Fayetteville, Arkansas	20–21
September 3	**Southern Miss**	Kentucky	Commonwealth Stadium • Lexington, Kentucky	44–35
September 9	Maryland	**FIU**	FIU Stadium • Miami, Florida	41–14
September 10	**Florida Atlantic**	#25 Miami	Hard Rock Stadium • Miami Gardens, Florida	10–38
September 10	**Middle Tennessee**	Vanderbilt	Vanderbilt Stadium • Nashville, Tennessee	24–47
September 10	**UTEP**	#11 Texas	Darrell K Royal–Texas Memorial Stadium • Austin, Texas	7–41
September 10	**WKU**	#1 Alabama	Bryant–Denny Stadium • Tuscaloosa, Alabama	10–38
September 16	Baylor	**Rice**	Rice Stadium • Houston	38–10
September 16	Arizona State	**UTSA**	Alamodome • San Antonio, Texas	32–28
September 17	**Florida Atlantic**	Kansas St.	Bill Snyder Family Football Stadium • Manhattan, Kansas	7–63
September 17	**Louisiana Tech**	Texas Tech	Jones AT&T Stadium • Lubbock, Texas	45–59
September 17	**North Texas**	Florida	Ben Hill Griffin Stadium • Gainesville, Florida	0–32
September 17	**Old Dominion**	NC State	Carter–Finley Stadium • Raleigh, North Carolina	22–49
September 24	Vanderbilt	**WKU**	Houchens Industries–L. T. Smith Stadium • Bowling Green, Kentucky	31–30 OT
September 24	Louisville	**Marshall**	Joan C. Edwards Stadium • Huntington, West Virginia	59–28
October 1	**Marshall**	Pittsburgh	Heinz Field • Pittsburgh	27–43
October 15	**Southern Miss**	LSU	Tiger Stadium • Baton Rouge, Louisiana	10–45
October 22	**Middle Tennessee**	Missouri	Faurot Field • Columbia, Missouri	51–45
November 19	**UTSA**	Texas A&M	Kyle Field • College Station, Texas	10–23
November 26	**Rice**	Stanford	Stanford Stadium • Stanford, California	17–41

=== 2016 records against non-conference opponents ===
**Regular season**

Power 5 conferences	Record
ACC	0–5
Big Ten	0–2
Big 12	0–4
Pac-12	0–2
SEC	2–7
Power 5 Total	2–20
Other FBS conferences	Record
American	0–3
Independents	3–3
MAC	2–3
Mountain West	0–1
Sun Belt	1–2
Other FBS Total	6–12
FCS Opponents	Record
Football Championship Subdivision	11–0
Total non-conference record	19–32

**Post season**

Other FBS conferences	Record
American	2–0
Independents	0–1
MAC	1–0
Mountain West	0–2
Sun Belt	1–0
Total bowl record	4–2

== Postseason ==
=== Bowl games ===
Per conference regulations, all teams with seven or more wins shall be placed into conference bowls prior to any other bowl eligible teams without a winning record (i.e. 6–6 record). The rankings are from final CFP Poll and all game times are in Eastern. Old Dominion was the first team to accept a bowl bid on November 28.

Date	Time	Bowl Game	Site	TV	CUSA Team	Opponent	Result
December 27, 2016	12:00 p.m.	Heart of Dallas Bowl	Cotton Bowl • Dallas	ESPN	North Texas	Army	Army 38, North Texas 31 OT
December 24, 2016	8:00 p.m.	Hawaii Bowl	Aloha Stadium • Honolulu, Hawaii	ESPN	Middle Tennessee	Hawaii	Hawaii 52, Middle Tennessee 35
December 23, 2016	3:30 p.m.	Armed Forces Bowl*	Amon G. Carter Stadium • Fort Worth, Texas	ESPN	Louisiana Tech	Navy	Louisiana Tech 48, Navy 45
December 23, 2016	1:00 p.m.	Bahamas Bowl	Thomas Robinson Stadium • Nassau, Bahamas	ESPN	Old Dominion	Eastern Michigan	Old Dominion 24, Eastern Michigan 20
December 20, 2016	7:00 p.m.	Boca Raton Bowl	FAU Stadium • Boca Raton, Florida	ESPN	Western Kentucky	Memphis	Western Kentucky 51 Memphis 31
December 17, 2016	9:00 p.m.	New Orleans Bowl	Mercedes-Benz Superdome • New Orleans	ESPN	Southern Miss.	UL-Layfeyette	Southern Miss 28 UL Lafayette 21
December 17, 2016	2:00 p.m.	New Mexico Bowl	University Stadium • Albuquerque, New Mexico	ESPN	UTSA	New Mexico	New Mexico 23 UTSA 20

- Additional bowl game offer. C-USA had no previous arrangement to play in the Armed Forces Bowl.

=== Postseason awards ===
- Most Valuable Player:Ryan Higgins
- Offensive player of the year:Carlos Henderson
- Defensive player of the year:Trey Hendrickson
- Coach of the Year:Skip Holtz
- Freshman of the Year:Josiah Tauaefa
- Newcomer of the Year:Mike White

All C-USA

== Home game attendance ==
Team	Stadium	Capacity	Game 1	Game 2	Game 3	Game 4	Game 5	Game 6	Game 7	Total	Average	% of Capacity
Charlotte	Jerry Richardson Stadium	15,314	**15,807**†	15,080	12,589	13,939	14,306	13,433	—	85,154	14,192	92.67%
FIU	FIU Stadium	20,000	16,089	17,084	18,524†	16,164	17,061	14,413	15,054	114,389	16,341	81.70%
Florida Atlantic	FAU Stadium	29,419	14,887†	13,846	7,401	9,338	9,122	5,843	—	60,437	10,072	34.24%
Louisiana Tech	Joe Aillet Stadium	28,019	16,910	22,101	17,978	22,058	23,012†	—	—	102,059	20,411	73.64%
Marshall	Joan C. Edwards Stadium	38,227	26,488	24,258	**40,592**†	22,839	20,904	20,841	17,397	172,319	24,759	64.77%
Middle Tennessee	Johnny "Red" Floyd Stadium	30,788	19,967	20,105	22,411†	13,505	10,227	—	—	86,215	17,243	56.00%
North Texas	Apogee Stadium	30,850	24,718†	15,609	19,823	18,216	21,643	19,120	—	119,129	19,854	64.36%
Old Dominion	Foreman Field	20,118	20,118	20,118	20,118	20,118	20,118	20,118	—	120,708	20,118	100.00%
Rice	Rice Stadium	47,000	27,047†	20,792	20,134	21,538	19,892	19,148	—	121,151	20,258	43.10%
Southern Miss	M. M. Roberts Stadium	36,000	29,509	27,905	28,325	31,275†	28,347	26,164	—	171,525	28,587	79.41%
UTEP	Sun Bowl Stadium	51,500	30,119	37,893†	21,419	17,751	19,254	15,977	18,591	161,004	23,000	44.66%
UTSA	Alamodome	65,000	22,380	29,035†	19,818	23,633	19,553	23,807	—	138,226	23,037	35.44%
WKU	Houchens Industries–L. T. Smith Stadium	22,113	19,286	**23,674**†	17,331	18,676	15,516	16,239	—	110,722	18,453	83.45%

Bold – Exceed capacity
†Season High
