= Kind =

Kind or KIND may refer to:

== Concepts ==
- Kindness, the human behaviour
- Kind, a basic unit of categorization
- Kind (type theory), a concept in logic and computer science
- Natural kind, in philosophy
- Created kind, often abbreviated to kinds, a creationist category of life forms
- In kind, for non-monetary transactions

== Radio and television stations ==
- KIND (AM), a radio station (1010 AM) licensed to Independence, Kansas, United States
- KIND-FM, a radio station (94.9 FM) licensed to Elk City, Kansas, United States
- KIND-LP, a low-power radio station (94.1 FM) licensed to serve Oxnard, California, United States
- KBIK, a radio station (102.9 FM) licensed to Independence, Kansas, United States that held the call sign KIND-FM from 1980 to 2010

== Other uses ==
- Kind (company), an American snack food manufacturer
- Kids in Need of Defense, a children's rights organization co-founded by actress Angelina Jolie
- Kind (album), a 2019 album by Stereophonics
- Kind (surname), a list of people with the surname
- Kind (horse) (foaled 2001), an Irish Thoroughbred racehorse
- Kind Hundred, a hundred divided between Halland, Småland and Västergötland, Sweden
- Indianapolis International Airport (ICAO code: KIND), an airport in Indiana, United States

== See also ==
- Kinda (disambiguation)
