= KIND (AM) =

Sports radio station in Independence, Kansas

- Independence, Kansas; United States
- Frequency: 1010 kHz
- Branding: 101.9 FM 1010 AM The Fan

Programming
- Format: Sports
- Affiliations: Fox Sports Radio; Kansas City Royals

Ownership
- Owner: My Town Media, Inc.
- Sister stations: KEKS, KKOY-FM, KKOY, KKOY-FM, KINZ, KBIK, KIND-FM

History
- First air date: February 6, 1948
- Call sign meaning: INDependence

Technical information
- Licensing authority: FCC
- Facility ID: 9799
- Class: D
- Power: 250 watts day 32 watts night
- Transmitter coordinates: type:city 37°13′7.00″N 95°43′30.00″W
- Translator: 101.9 K270CQ (Independence)

Links
- Public license information: Public file; LMS
- Website: www.1010kind.com

KIND (1010 kHz) is an AM radio station. It is owned by My Town Media, Inc. and is licensed to Independence, Kansas. My Town Media, Inc. is located in Pittsburg, Kansas.

The format is sports and is known as 101.9 FM 1010 AM The Fan.

1010 AM is a Canadian clear-channel frequency, on which CFRB and CBR are the dominant Class A stations.

Logo before translator sign on
