= Kindness (disambiguation) =

Kindness is a type of behaviour.

Kindness may also refer to:

- Kindness (musician), stage name of Adam Bainbridge
- Smokie (band), called Kindness between 1970 and 1974
- Life Vest Inside, Global Kindness Organization
- "Kindness", a song by Brett Kissel from the 2021 album What Is Life?

Kindness is also a family name, originally from North East Scotland. People commonly known by their family name Kindness include:

- Tom Kindness (1929–2004), member of the United States House of Representatives
- John Kindness (born 1951), Irish multi-media artist

== See also ==
- Kind (disambiguation)
