= KBIK =

Coordinates: 37.262°N 95.767°W

- Independence, Kansas; United States
- Broadcast area: Independence (Southeast Kansas); Neodesha, Kansas; Cherryvale, Kansas
- Frequency: 102.9 MHz
- Branding: Thunder Country 102.9

Programming
- Format: Country

Ownership
- Owner: My Town Media, Inc.
- Sister stations: KIND, KIND-FM, KKOY, KKOY-FM

Technical information
- Licensing authority: FCC
- Facility ID: 9793
- Class: C3
- ERP: 25,000 watts
- HAAT: 83 meters (272 ft)

Links
- Public license information: Public file; LMS

KBIK (102.9 FM) is a radio station licensed in Independence, Kansas. It broadcasts country music. The station is owned by My Town Media, Inc.
