= KKOY =

KKOY may refer to:

- KKOY (AM), a radio station (1460 AM) licensed to Chanute, Kansas, United States
- KKOY-FM, a radio station (105.5 FM) licensed to Chanute, Kansas, United States
