= 2016 North Texas Mean Green football team =

American college football season

2016 North Texas Mean Green football
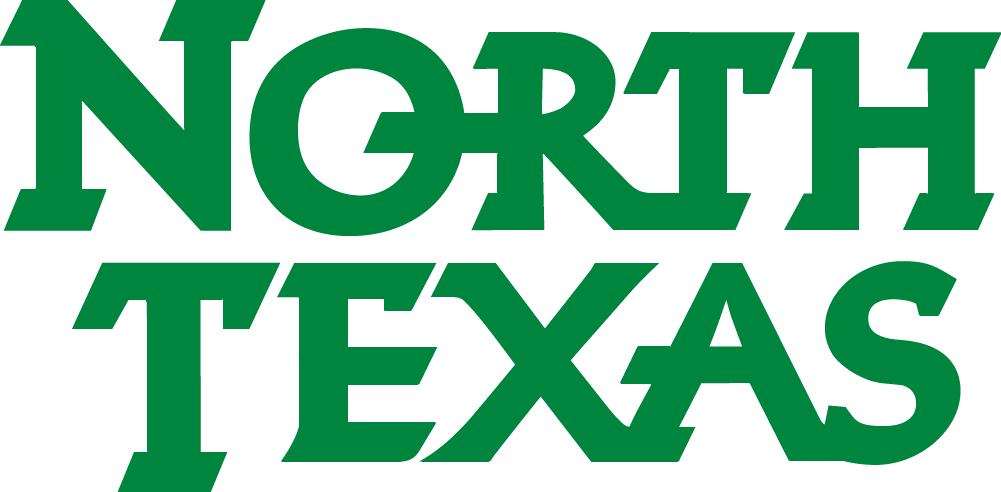

Heart of Dallas Bowl, L 31–38 ^{OT} vs. Army
- Conference: Conference USA
- West Division
- Record: 5–8 (3–5 C-USA)
- Head coach: Seth Littrell (1st season)
- Offensive coordinator: Graham Harrell (1st season)
- Offensive scheme: Air raid
- Defensive coordinator: Mike Ekeler (1st season)
- Co-defensive coordinator: Troy Reffett (1st season)
- Base defense: 4–3
- Home stadium: Apogee Stadium

2016 Conference USA football standings
	Conf.			Overall
Team	W		L	W		L
East Division
Western Kentucky xy$	7	–	1	11	–	3
Old Dominion x	7	–	1	10	–	3
Middle Tennessee	5	–	3	8	–	5
FIU	4	–	4	4	–	8
Charlotte	3	–	5	4	–	8
Marshall	2	–	6	3	–	9
Florida Atlantic	2	–	6	3	–	9
West Division
Louisiana Tech xy	6	–	2	9	–	5
UTSA	5	–	3	6	–	7
Southern Miss	4	–	4	7	–	6
North Texas	3	–	5	5	–	8
Rice	2	–	6	3	–	9
UTEP	2	–	6	4	–	8
Championship: Western Kentucky 58, Louisiana Tech 44
$ – Conference champion; x – Division champion/co-champions; y – Championship game participant; Rankings from AP Poll

The 2016 North Texas Mean Green football team represented the University of North Texas as a member of Conference USA (C-USA) during the 2016 NCAA Division I FBS football season. Led by first-year head coach Seth Littrell, the Mean Green compiled an overall record of 5–8 with a mark 3–5 in conference play, placing fourth in C-USA's West Division. Because there were not enough six-win bowl eligible teams, North Texas received a bowl invitation as a 5–7 team with the highest Academic Progress Rate (APR) score. The Mean Green were invited to the Heart of Dallas Bowl, where they lost to Army in overtime. The team played home games at Apogee Stadium in Denton, Texas.

== Schedule ==
North Texas announced its 2016 football schedule on February 4, 2016. The schedule consisted of six home and six away games in the regular season.

Date	Time	Opponent	Site	TV	Result	Attendance
September 3	6:00 p.m.	SMU*	Apogee Stadium; Denton, TX (Safeway Bowl)	ASN	L 21–34	24,718
September 10	6:00 p.m.	Bethune-Cookman*	Apogee Stadium; Denton, TX	CUSA.tv	W 41–20	15,609
September 17	6:30 p.m.	at No. 23 Florida*	Ben Hill Griffin Stadium; Gainesville, FL	ESPNU	L 0–32	86,848
September 24	5:00 p.m.	at Rice	Rice Stadium; Houston, TX	CUSA.tv	W 42–35 ^{2OT}	20,792
October 1	6:00 p.m.	Middle Tennessee	Apogee Stadium; Denton, TX	CI	L 13–30	19,823
October 8	6:00 p.m.	Marshall	Apogee Stadium; Denton, TX	ASN	W 38–21	18,216
October 22	11:00 a.m.	at Army*	Michie Stadium; West Point, NY	CBSSN	W 35–18	31,127
October 29	6:00 p.m.	at UTSA	Alamodome; San Antonio, TX	CUSA.tv	L 17–31	19,553
November 5	4:30 p.m.	Louisiana Tech^{†}	Apogee Stadium; Denton, TX	ESPN3	L 24–45	21,643
November 12	2:30 p.m.	at WKU	Houchens Industries–L. T. Smith Stadium; Bowling Green, KY	ESPN3	L 7–45	16,239
November 19	4:30 p.m.	Southern Miss	Apogee Stadium; Denton, TX	beIN	W 29–23	19,120
November 26	3:00 p.m.	at UTEP	Sun Bowl; El Paso, TX	CUSA.tv	L 24–52	18,591
December 27	11:00 a.m.	vs. Army*	Cotton Bowl; Dallas, TX (Heart of Dallas Bowl)	ESPN	L 31–38 ^{OT}	39,117
*Non-conference game; ^{†}Homecoming; Rankings from AP Poll released prior to the game; All times are in Central time

== Game summaries ==
=== SMU ===
SMU Mustangs vs North Texas Mean Green – Game summary

Quarter	1	2	3	4	Total
SMU	17	7	10	0	34
North Texas	0	14	0	7	21

at Apogee Stadium • Denton, Texas

- Date: September 3, 2016
- Game time: 06:06 p.m. CDT
- Game weather: Temperature: 86 °F (30 °C) • Wind: 12 E • Weather: Clear
- Game attendance: 24,718
- Referee: Referee: Tracy Jones, *Umpire: Nick Pergine* Linesman: Lyndell Shelton* Line Judge: Colin Gaynor* Back Judge: Jim Downey* Field Judge: Jim Smith* Side Judge: Matt Waldron*
- TV: ASN

Game information

First Quarter

- SMU 13:01 – Xavier Jones 49 yard run (Josh Williams kick), SMU 7–0
- SMU 05:46 – Josh Williams 29 yard field goal, SMU 10–0
- SMU 00:23 – Courtland Sutton 88 yard pass from Ben Hicks (Josh Williams kick), SMU 17–0

Second Quarter

- UNT 11:19 – Thaddeous Thompson 7 yard pass from Alec Morris (Trevor Moore kick), SMU 17–7
- SMU 01:59 – Courtland Sutton 46 yard pass from Matt Davis (Josh Williams kick), SMU 24–7
- UNT 00:38 – Kelvin Smith 25 yard pass from Alec Morris (Trevor Moore kick), SMU 24–14

Third Quarter

- SMU 07:15 – Coutland Sutton 4 yard pass from Matt Davis (Josh Williams kick), SMU 31–14
- SMU 00:57 – Michael Armstrong 22 yard field goal, SMU 34–14

Fourth Quarter

- UNT 02:21 – Jeffrey Wilson 11 yd run (Trevor Moore kick), SMU 34–21

Top Passers

- SMU – Matt Davis 8/17, 155 yards, 2 TDs, INT
- UNT – Alec Morris 24/39, 237 yards, 2 TDs, 3 INTs

Top Rushers

- SMU – Xavier Jones 11 carries, 117 yards, TD
- UNT – Jeffrey Wilson 15 carries, 88 yards, TD

Top Receiving

- SMU – Courtland Sutton 4 receptions, 162 yards, 3 TDs
- UNT – Willie Robinson 8 receptions, 73 yards

Top Tacklers

- SMU – Justin Lawler 8 tackles
- UNT – Kishawn McClain 8 tackles

=== Bethune–Cookman ===
Bethune–Cookman Panthers vs North Texas Mean Green – Game summary

Quarter	1	2	3	4	Total
Wildcats	7	0	6	7	20
Mean Green	7	17	10	7	41

at Apogee Stadium • Denton, Texas

- Date: September 10, 2016
- Game time: 06:00 p.m.
- Game attendance: 15,609
- TV: CUSA.TV

Game information

First Quarter

- COOK 11:24 – Frank Brown 88 yard punt return (Uriel Hernandez kick), COOK 7–0
- UNT 8:10 – Jeffrey Wilson 20 yard run (Trevor Moore kick), tied 7–7

Second Quarter

- UNT 10:32 – Andrew Tucker 1 yard blocked punt return (Trevor Moore kick), UNT 14–7
- UNT 7:02 – Jeffrey Wilson 10 yard run (Trevor Moore kick), UNT 21–7
- UNT 0:16 – Trevor Moore 19 yard field goal, UNT 24–7

Third Quarter

- UNT 10:38 – Andrew Tucker 1 yard run (Trevor Moore kick), UNT 31–7
- COOK 6:19 – Diquan Richardson 30 yard interception return, UNT 31–13
- UNT 4:33 – Trevor Moore 20 yard field goal, UNT 34–13

Fourth Quarter

- UNT 10:21 – Willy Ivery 25 yard run (Trevor Moore kick), UNT 41–13
- COOK 2:42 – Akevious Williams 83 yard run (Uriel Hernandez kick), UNT 41–20

Top Passers

- COOK – Larry Brihim, Jr. 8/19, 74 yards, INT
- UNT – Mason Fine 11/22, 108 yards

Top Rushers

- COOK – Akevious Williams 2 carries, 85 yards, TD
- UNT – Willy Ivery 13 carries, 103 yards, TD

Top Receiving

- COOK – Jawill Davis 4 receptions, 49 yards
- UNT – Thaddeous Thompson 1 reception, 32 yards

After falling to FCS Portland State 66–7 the previous season, the Mean Green soundly beat FCS Bethune–Cookman 41–20. Mason Fine entered the game as North Texas's quarterback midway through the 3rd quarter following an Alec Morris interception that was returned for a touchdown. Fine would later be named as the starter for the Mean Green.

=== At Florida ===
North Texas Mean Green at #23 Florida Gators – Game summary

Quarter	1	2	3	4	Total
Mean Green	0	0	0	0	0
#23 Gators	5	14	0	13	32

at Ben Hill Griffin Stadium • Gainesville, Florida

- Date: September 17, 2016
- Game time: 06:30 p.m.
- Game weather: Temperature: 83 °F (28 °C) • Wind: E at 5 miles per hour (8.0 km/h) • Weather: Cloudy, 73% humidity
- Game attendance: 86,848
- TV announcers (ESPNU): Clay Matvick and Dusty Dvoracek

Game information

First Quarter

- FLA 13:04 – Mason Fine sacked by Caleb Brantley for a 7 yard loss, FLA 2–0
- FLA 8:49 – Eddy Pineiro 22 yard field goal, FLA 5–0

Second Quarter

- FLA 12:32 – Jordan Cronkrite 6 yard run (Eddy Pineiro kick), FLA 12–0
- FLA 3:00 – Lamical Perine 2 yard run (Eddy Pineiro kick), FLA 19–0

Third Quarter

- No scoring plays

Fourth Quarter

- FLA 13:46 – Mark Thompson 20 yard run, FLA 25–0
- FLA 7:15 – Jordan Scarlett 1 yard run (Eddy Pineiro kick), FLA 32–0

Top Passers

- UNT – Mason Fine 6/22, 66 yards, INT
- FLA – Luke Del Rio 14/25, 186 yards, INT

Top Rushers

- UNT – Jeffrey Wilson 10 carries, 26 yards
- FLA – Mark Thompson 11 carries, 85 yards, TD

Top Receiving

- UNT – Thaddeous Thompson 3 receptions, 50 yards
- FLA – Josh Hammond 2 receptions, 72 yards

=== At Rice ===
North Texas Mean Green at Rice Owls – Game summary

Quarter	1	2	3	4	OT	2OT	Total
Mean Green	0	14	7	7	7	7	42
Owls	10	7	3	8	7	0	35

at Rice Stadium • Houston, Texas

- Date: September 24, 2016
- Game time: 5:00 p.m.
- Game attendance: 20,792
- TV: CUSA.TV

Game information

First Quarter

- RICE 9:31 – Hayden Tobola 40 yard field goal, RICE 3–0
- RICE 3:17 – Lance Wright 14 yard pass from Tyler Stehling (Hayden Tobola kick), RICE 10–0

Second Quarter

- RICE 13:02 – Emmanuel Eskupa 1 yard run (Hayden Tobola kick), RICE 17–0
- UNT 10:28 – Willy Ivery 16 yard pass from Mason Fine (Trevor Moore kick), RICE 17–7
- UNT 0:45 – Jeffrey Wilson 1 yard run (Trevor Moore kick), RICE 17–14

Third Quarter

- RICE 7:35 – Hayden Tobola 36 yard field goal, RICE 20–14
- UNT 7:27 – Jeffrey Wilson 75 yard run (Trevor Moore kick), UNT 21–20

Fourth Quarter

- UNT 7:31 – Willy Ivery 1 yard run (Trevor Moore kick), UNT 28–20
- RICE 2:34 – Darik Dillard 1 yard run (Tyler Stehling pass), tied 28–28

Overtime

- RICE – Darik Dillard 3 yard run (Hayden Tobola kick), RICE 35–28
- UNT – Jeffrey Wilson 5 yard run (Trevor Moore kick), tied 35–35

Second overtime

- UNT – Will Ivery 4 yard run (Trevor Moore kick), UNT 42–35

Top Passers

- UNT – Mason Fine 17/29, 224 yards, TD
- RICE – Tyler Stehling 22/38, 232 yards, TD, INT

Top Rushers

- UNT – Jeffrey Wilson 18 carries, 157 yards, 3 TDs
- RICE – Tyler Stehling 13 carries, 92 yards

Top Receiving

- UNT – Kenny Buyers 4 receptions, 102 yards
- RICE – Zach Wright 10 receptions, 120 yards

The Mean Green traveled to Houston to open up conference play against the Rice Owls. UNT won over Rive 42–35 in double overtime after trailing 17–0. With the win, the Mean Green improved to an overall record of 2–2, and surpassed their win total from the previous season.

=== Middle Tennessee ===
Middle Tennessee Blue Raiders at North Texas Mean Green – Game summary

Quarter	1	2	3	4	Total
Blue Raiders	0	13	7	10	30
Mean Green	7	0	0	6	13

at Apogee Stadium • Denton, Texas

- Date: October 1, 2016
- Game time: 5:00 p.m.
- Game attendance: 19,823
- TV: CI

Game information

First Quarter

- UNT 7:21 – Jeffrey Wilson 1 yard run (Trevor Moore kick), UNT 7-0

Second Quarter

- MTSU 12:58 – Canon Rooker 25 yard field goal, UNT 7–3
- MTSU 9:24 – Canon Rooker 34 yard field goal, UNT 7–6
- MTSU 0:36 – Brent Stockstill 11 yard pass to Dennis Andrews (Canon Rooker kick), MTSU 13–7

Third Quarter

- MTSU 3:14 – Ty Lee 9 yard pass from Brent Stockstill (Canon Rooker kick), MTSU 20–7

Fourth Quarter

- MTSU 14:05 – Canon Rooker 36 yard field goal, MTSU 23–7
- UNT 1:57 – Kelvin Smith 5 yard pass from Mason Fine, MTSU 23–13
- MTSU 1:46 – I'Tavius Mathers 46 yard run (Canon Rooker kick), MTSU 30–13

Top Passers

- MTSU – Brent Stockstill 24/45, 295 yards, 2 TD, INT
- UNT – Mason Fine 35/54, 303 yards, TD

Top Rushers

- MTSU – I'Tavius Mathers 24 carries, 135 yards, TD
- UNT – Jeffrey Wilson 10 carries, 24 yards, TD

Top Receiving

- MTSU – Richie James 8 receptions, 134 yards
- UNT – Terian Goree 9 receptions, 100 yards

=== Marshall ===
Marshall Thundering Herd at North Texas Mean Green – Game summary

Quarter	1	2	3	4	Total
Thundering Herd	7	0	14	0	21
Mean Green	7	7	14	10	38

at Apogee Stadium • Denton, Texas

- Date: October 8, 2016
- Game time: 6:00 p.m.
- Game attendance: 18,216
- TV: ASN

Game information

First Quarter

- UNT 10:22 – Jeffrey Wilson 4 yard run (Trevor Moore kick), UNT 7–0
- MRSH 1:03 – Chase Litton 6 yard run (Amoreto Curraj kick), tied 7–7

Second Quarter

- UNT 10:33 – Mason Fine 8 yard run (Trevor Moore kick), UNT 14–7

Third Quarter

- MRSH 14:47 – Keion Davis 99 yard kick return (Amoreto Curraj kick), tied 14–14
- UNT 6:31 – Tyler Wilson 11 yard pass from Mason Fine (Trevor Moore kick), UNT 21–14
- MRSH 4:00 – Ryan Yurachek 1 yard pass from Chas Litton (Amoreto Curraj kick), tied 21–21
- UNT 3:15 – Jeffrey Wilson 72 yard run (Trevor Moore kick), UNT 28–21

Fourth Quarter

- UNT 4:26 – Trevor Moore 31 yard field goal, UNT 31–21
- UNT 2:35 – Erick Jenkins 52 yard interception return (Trevor Moore kick), UNT 38–21

Top Passers

- MRSH – Chase Litton 20/42, 258 yards, TD, INT
- UNT – Mason Fine 18/28, 206 yards, TD

Top Rushers

- MRSH – Keion Davis 14 carries, 33 yards
- UNT – Jeffrey Wilson 26 carries, 188 yards, TD

Top Receiving

- MRSH – Michael Clark 8 receptions, 122 yards
- UNT – Thaddeous Thompson 5 receptions, 68 yards

Marshall entered the game with a 76.6% win probability against North Texas, but the Mean Green came out on top over the Thundering Herd with a 38–21 victory. This is North Texas's first ever win over Marshall.

=== At Army ===
North Texas Mean Green at Army Black Knights – Game summary

Quarter	1	2	3	4	Total
Mean Green	14	0	14	7	35
Black Knights	7	3	8	0	18

at Michie Stadium • West Point, NY

- Date: October 22, 2016
- Game time: 11:00 a.m.
- Game weather: Temperature: 45 °F (7 °C) • Weather: cloudy, 55% chance of rain
- Game attendance: 31,127
- Referee: Jerry Magallanes
- TV announcers (CBSSN): Ben Holden (Play-by-play), Jay Feely (color), & John Schriffen (sideline)
- ESPN – Jeffrey Wilson scores 3 times, North Texas beats Army 35–18

Game information

First Quarter

- ARMY 7:38 – Darnell Woolfolk 9 yard run (Blake Wilson kick), ARMY 7–0
- UNT 5:38 – Terian Goree 34 yard pass from Mason Fine (Trevor Moore kick), tied 7–7
- UNT 4:57 – Eric Jenkins 34 yard interception return (Trevor Moore kick), UNT 14–7

Second Quarter

- ARMY 13:28 – Blake Wilson 39 yard field goal, UNT 14–10

Third Quarter

- UNT 13:28 – Jeffrey Wilson 41 yard run (Trevor Moore kick), UNT 21–10
- UNT 7:33 – Jeffrey Wilson 1 yard run (Trevor Moore kick), UNT 28–10
- ARMY 1:14 – Ahmad Bradshaw 6 yard run (Bradshaw run for two-point conversion), UNT 28–18

Fourth Quarter

- UNT 5:58 – Jeffrey Wilson 1 yard run (Trevor Moore kick), UNT 35–18

Top Passers

- UNT – Mason Fine 9/17, 118 yards, TD, INT
- ARMY – Ahmad Bradshaw 7/21, 94 yards, 4 INT

Top Rushers

- UNT – Jeffrey Wilson 15 carries, 160 yards, 2 TD
- ARMY – Ahmad Bradshaw 24 carries, 90 yards, TD

Top Receiving

- UNT – Terian Goree 2 receptions, 41 yards, TD
- ARMY – Dalton Mendenhall 1 reception, 39 yards

=== At UTSA ===
North Texas Mean Green at UTSA Roadrunners – Game summary

Quarter	1	2	3	4	Total
Mean Green	0	0	7	10	17
Roadrunners	7	7	10	7	31

at Alamodome • San Antonio, Texas

- Date: October 29, 2016
- Game time: 6:00 p.m.
- Game attendance: 19,553
- TV: CUSA.tv

Game information

First Quarter

- UTSA 5:34 – Kerry Thomas, Jr. 7 yard pass from Dalton Sturm (Victor Falcon kick), UTSA 7–0

Second Quarter

- UTSA 11:27 – Josh Stewart 21 yard pass from Dalton Sturm (Victor Falcon kick), UTSA 14–0

Third Quarter

- UNT 14:40 – Mason Fine 80 yard run (Trevor Moore kick), UTSA 14–7
- UTSA 10:47 – Victor Falcon 33 yard field goal, UTSA 17–7
- UTSA 5:34 – Jalen Rhodes 9 yard run (Victor Falcon kick), UTSA 24–7

Fourth Quarter

- UNT 14:17 – Trevor Moore 20 yard field goal, UTSA 24–10
- UTSA 9:51 – Jalen Rhodes 19 yard run (Victor Falcon kick), UTSA 31–10
- UNT 5:45 – Kenny Buyers 10 yard pass from Mason Fine (Trevor Moore kick), UTSA 31–17

Top Passers

- UNT – Mason Fine 27/38, 257 yards, TD, 2 INT
- UTSA – Dalton Sturm 10/19, 142 yards, 2 TD

Top Rushers

- UNT – Mason Fine 12 carries, 91 yards, TD
- UTSA – Jalen Rhodes 9 carries, 74 yards, 2 TD

Top Receiving

- UNT – Thaddeous Thompson 6 receptions, 65 yards
- UTSA – Josh Stewart 4 receptions, 84 yards, TD

=== Louisiana Tech ===
Middle Tennessee Blue Raiders at North Texas Mean Green – Game summary

Quarter	1	2	3	4	Total
Bulldogs	14	17	7	7	45
Mean Green	7	14	3	0	24

at Apogee Stadium • Denton, Texas

- Date: November 5, 2016
- Game time: 4:30 p.m.
- Game attendance: 21,643
- TV: ESPN3

Game information

First Quarter

- LTU 13:05 – Carlos Henderson 52 yard pass from Ryan Higgins (Jonathan Barnes kick), LTU 7–0
- UNT 4:25 – Jeffrey Wilson 1 yard run (Trevor Moore kick), tied 7–7
- LTU 0:39 – Carlos Henderson 24 yard run (Jonathan Barnes kick), LTU 14–7

Second Quarter

- UNT 12:18 – Terian Goree 32 yard pass from Mason Fine (Trevor Moore kick), tied 14–14
- LTU 9:10 – Carlos Henderson 10 yard pass from Ryan Higgins (Jonathan Barnes kick), LTU 21–14
- LTU 4:14 – Jarred Craft 2 yard run (Jonathan Barnes kick), LTU 28–14
- UNT 1:28 – Willy Ivery 4 yard run (Trevor Moore kick), LTU 28–21
- LTU 0:14 – Jonathan Barnes 48 yard field goal, LTU 31–21

Third Quarter

- UNT 9:34 – Trevor Moore 51 yard field goal, LTU 31–24
- LTU 7:13 – Carlos Henderson 12 yard pass from Ryan Higgins (Jonathan Barnes kick), LTU 38–24

Fourth Quarter

- LTU 14:13 – Carlos Henderson 9 yard pass from Ryan Higgins (Jonathan Barnes kick), LTU 45–24

Top Passers

- LTU – Ryan Higgins 18/30, 253 yards, 4 TD, INT
- UNT – Mason Fine 23/34, 207 yards, TD, INT

Top Rushers

- LTU – Jarred Craft 24 carries, 120 yards, TD
- UNT – Jeffrey Wilson 15 carries, 66 yards, TD

Top Receiving

- LTU – Carlos Henderson 8 receptions, 133 yards, 4 TD
- UNT – Jeffrey Wilson 4 receptions, 61 yards

=== At WKU ===
North Texas Mean Green at Western Kentucky Wildcats – Game summary

Quarter	1	2	3	4	Total
Mean Green	0	0	7	0	7
Hilltoppers	17	14	14	0	45

at Houchens Industries–L. T. Smith Stadium • Bowling Green, Kentucky

- Date: November 12, 2016
- Game time: 2:30 p.m.
- Game attendance: 16,239
- TV: ESPN3

Game information

First Quarter

- WKU 12:31 – Taywon Taylor 64 yard pass from Mike White (Skyler Simcox kick), WKU 7–0
- WKU 10:40 – Taywon Taylor 75 yard pass from Mike White (Skyler Simcox kick), WKU 14–0
- WKU 6:22 – Skyler Simcox 24 yard field goal, WKU 17–0

Second Quarter

- WKU 9:35 – Nicholas Norris 33 yard pass from Mike White (Skyler Simcox kick), WKU 24–0
- WKU 0:27 – Anthony Wales 3 yard run (Skyler Simcox kick), WKU 31–0

Third Quarter

- WKU 10:32 – Nicholas Norris 24 yard pass from Mike White (Skyler Simcox kick), WKU 38–0
- UNT 4:35 – Andrew Tucker 71 yard run (Trevor Moore kick), WKU 38–7
- WKU 3:00 – Taywon Taylor 4 yard pass from Tyler Ferguson (Skyler Simcox kick), WKU 45–7

Fourth Quarter

- No scoring plays

Top Passers

- UNT – Alec Morris 14/26, 108 yards, INT
- WKU – Mike White 14/25, 316 yards, 4 TD

Top Rushers

- UNT – Andrew Tucker 3 carries, 82 yards, TD
- WKU – Anthony Wales 18 carries, 121 yards, TD

Top Receiving

- UNT – Willie Robinson 2 receptions, 31 yards
- WKU – Taywon Taylor 6 receptions, 166 yards, 3 TD

=== Southern Miss ===
Southern Miss Golden Eagles at North Texas Mean Green – Game summary

Quarter	1	2	3	4	Total
Golden Eagles	0	7	13	3	23
Mean Green	17	3	0	9	29

at Apogee Stadium • Denton, Texas

- Date: November 19, 2016
- Game time: 4:30 p.m.
- Game weather: Sunny • Temperature: 56 °F (13 °C) • Wind: N 7 MPH
- Game attendance: 19,120
- TV: beIN

Game information

First Quarter

- UNT 8:12 – Trevor Moore 26 yard field goal, UNT 3–0
- UNT 3:16 – Turner Smiley 17 yard pass from Alec Morris (Trevor Moore kick), UNT 10–0
- UNT 1:22 – Turner Smiley 55 yard pass from Alec Morris (Trevor Moore kick), UNT 17–0

Second Quarter

- UNT 10:42 – Trevor Moore 39 yard field goal, UNT 20–0
- MSU 0:25 – Ito Smith 1 yard run (Stephen Brachule kick), UNT 20–7

Third Quarter

- USM 13:44 – Ito Smith 2 yard run (Stephen Brachule PAT no good), UNT 20–13
- USM 9:07 – George Payne 16 yard run (Stephen Brachule kick), tied 20–20

Fourth Quarter

- USM 9:39 – Stephen Brachule 25 yard field goal, MSU 23–20
- UNT 7:34 – Willy Ivery 11 yard run (Trevor Moore kick), UNT 27–20
- UNT 3:08 – Southern Miss run for a 5 yard loss, UNT 29–20

Top Passers

- USM – Keon Howard 10/26, 135 yards, 3 INT
- UNT – Alec Morris 14/29, 267 yards, 2 TD, INT

Top Rushers

- USM – Ito Smith 19 carries, 113 yards, 2 TD
- UNT – Willy Ivery 18 carries, 111 yards, TD

Top Receiving

- USM – Ito Smith 3 receptions, 67 yards
- UNT – Turner Smiley 7 receptions, 162 yards, 2 TD

Top Tacklers

- USM – D'Nerius Antoine 9 tackles
- UNT – Kishawn McClain 8 tackles

=== At UTEP ===
North Texas Mean Green at UTEP Miners – Game summary

Quarter	1	2	3	4	Total
Mean Green	7	10	0	7	24
Miners	10	21	14	7	52

at Sun Bowl Stadium • El Paso, Texas

- Date: November 26, 2016
- Game time: 3:00 p.m.
- Game attendance: 18,591
- TV: CUSA.tv

Game information

First Quarter

- UTEP 6:27 – Jay Mattox 48 yard field goal, UTEP 3–0
- UNT 2:54 – Willy Ivery 14 yard run (Trevor Moore kick), UNT 7–3
- UTEP 2:36 – Aaron Jones 83 yard run (Jay Mattox kikc), UTEP 10–7

Second Quarter

- UTEP 13:57 – Aaron Jones 48 yard run (Jay Mattox kick), UTEP 17–7
- UTEP 10:50 – Cole Freytag 30 yard pass from Ryan Metz (Jay Mattox kick), UTEP 24–7
- UTEP 9:25 – Brandon Moss blocked punt return (Jay Mattox kick), UTEP 31–7
- UNT 3:35 – Thaddeous Thompson 10 yard pass from Alec Morris (Trevor Moore kick), UTEP 31–14
- UNT 0:18 – Trevor Moore 45 yard field goal, UTEP 31–17

Third Quarter

- UTEP 6:58 – Aaron Jones 3 yard run (Jay Mattox kick), UTEP 38–17
- UTEP 2:12 – Hayden Plinke 72 yard pass from Ryan Metz (Jay Mattox kick), UTEP 45–17

Fourth Quarter

- UTEP 7:51 – Aaron Jones 3 yard run (Jay Mattox kick), UTEP 52–17
- UNT 3:42 – Willy Ivery 14 yard pass from Alec Morris (Trevor Moore kick), UTEP 52–24

Top Passers

- UNT – Alec Morris 23/42, 197 yards, 2 TD
- UTEP – Ryan Metz 12/17, 171 yards, 2 TD

Top Rushers

- UNT – Willy Ivery 13 carries, 98 yards, TD
- UTEP – Aaron Jones 24 carries, 301 yards, 4 TD

Top Receiving

- UNT – Thaddeous Thompson 7 receptions, 74 yards, TD
- UTEP – Hayden Plinke 3 receptions, 84 yards, TD

=== Army—Heart of Dallas Bowl ===
Heart of Dallas Bowl – Game summary

Quarter	1	2	3	4	OT	Total
Black Knights	12	12	7	0	7	38
Mean Green	7	14	7	3	0	31

at Cotton Bowl • Dallas, Texas

- Date: December 27, 2016
- Game time: 11:00 a.m.
- Game weather: Mostly Cloudy • Temperature: 57 °F (14 °C) • Wind: NW 3 mph
- Game attendance: 39,117
- Referee: Hubert Owens
- TV announcers (ESPN): Allen Bestwick (Play-by-play), Mike Bellotti (color), & Kris Budden (sideline)

Game information

First Quarter

- (09:18) ARMY TD: Darnell Woolfolk 5-yard rush (Blake Wilson kick failed); 11 plays, 75 yards, 5:42
- (06:35) NT TD: Jeffery Wilson 22-yard rush (Trevor Moore kick); 6 plays, 66 yards, 2:37
- (04:56) ARMY TD: Tyler Campbell 70-yard rush (Kell Walker rush failed); 3 plays, 76 yards, 1:34

Second Quarter

- (13:05) ARMY TD: Darnell Woolfolk 1-yard rush (Ahmad Bradshaw rush fumbled); 10 plays, 67 yards 5:14
- (06:37) ARMY TD: Andy Davidson 6-yard rush (D. Mendenhall pass failed); 9 plays, 93 yards, 4:10
- (02:26) NT TD: Jeffery Wilson 22-yard pass from Alec Morris (Trevor Moore kick); 9 plays, 83 yards, 4:02
- (00:10) NT TD: Rico Bussey 27-yard pass from Alec Morris (Trevor Moore kick); 6 plays, 68 yards, 1:40

Third Quarter

- (07:41) ARMY TD: Ahmad Bradshaw 65-yard rush (Blake Wilson kick); 6 plays, 84 yards, 3:05
- (00:45) NT TD: Tyler Wilson 17-yard pass from Alec Morris (Trevor Moore kick); 1 play, 18 yards, 0:05

Fourth Quarter

- (00:28) NT FG: Trevor Moore 37-yard field goal; 11 plays, 50 yards, 1:50

Overtime

- ARMY TD: Jordan Asberry 3-yard rush (Blake Wilson kick); 7 plays, 25 yards

Top Passers

- Army – Ahmad Bradshaw: 2/3, 53 yds
- UNT – Alec Morris: 26/38, 304 yds, 3 TD, 1 INT

Top Rushers

- Army – Ahmad Bradshaw: 18 att, 129 yds, 1 TD
- UNT – Jeffery Wilson: 20 att, 81 yds, 1 TD

Top Receiving

- Army – Tyler Campbell: 1 rec, 38 yds
- UNT – Tyler Wilson: 5 rec, 81 yds, 1 TD
