= LifeVest =

LifeVest® refers to:

- a brand of wearable cardioverter defibrillator developed by LifeCor (company acquired by ZOLL Medical)

Life vest refers to a:

- personal flotation device

Life Vest Inside,

- Global Kindness Organization
