= 2016 Army Black Knights football team =

American college football season

2016 Army Black Knights football

Heart of Dallas Bowl champion

Heart of Dallas Bowl, W 38–31 ^{OT} vs. North Texas
- Conference: Independent
- Record: 8–5
- Head coach: Jeff Monken (3rd season)
- Offensive coordinator: Brent Davis (3rd season)
- Offensive scheme: Triple option
- Defensive coordinator: Jay Bateman (3rd season)
- Base defense: 3–4
- Captains: Andrew King; Jeremy Timpf
- Home stadium: Michie Stadium

2016 NCAA Division I FBS independents football records
	Conf.			Overall
Team	W		L	W		L
BYU		–		9	–	4
Army		–		8	–	5
Notre Dame		–		4	–	8
UMass		–		2	–	10
Rankings from AP Poll

The 2016 Army Black Knights football team represented the United States Military Academy as an independent in the 2016 NCAA Division I FBS football season. The Black Knights were led by third-year head coach Jeff Monken and played their home games at Michie Stadium. They finished the season 8–5 and defeated Navy for the first time since 2001 in the Army–Navy Game. They were invited to the Heart of Dallas Bowl where they defeated North Texas in overtime.

== Schedule ==
Date	Time	Opponent	Site	TV	Result	Attendance	Source
September 2	7:00 p.m.	at Temple	Lincoln Financial Field; Philadelphia, PA	CBSSN	W 28–13	34,005	
September 10	12:00 p.m.	Rice	Michie Stadium; West Point, NY	CBSSN	W 31–14	27,013	
September 17	7:00 p.m.	at UTEP	Sun Bowl; El Paso, TX	ASN	W 66–14	37,893	
September 24	7:00 p.m.	at Buffalo	University at Buffalo Stadium; Amherst, NY	ESPN3	L 20–23 ^{OT}	19,217	
October 8	3:30 p.m.	at Duke	Wallace Wade Stadium; Durham, NC	ACCN	L 6–13	20,613	
October 15	12:00 p.m.	Lafayette	Michie Stadium; West Point, NY	CBSSN	W 62–7	38,394	
October 22	12:00 p.m.	North Texas	Michie Stadium; West Point, NY	CBSSN	L 18–35	31,127	
October 29	3:30 p.m.	at Wake Forest	BB&T Field; Winston–Salem, NC	ACCN	W 21–13	27,948	
November 5	12:00 p.m.	Air Force	Michie Stadium; West Point, NY (Commander-in-Chief's Trophy)	CBSSN	L 12–31	38,443	
November 12	3:30 p.m.	vs. Notre Dame	Alamodome; San Antonio, TX (rivalry)	NBC	L 6–44	45,762	
November 19	12:00 p.m.	Morgan State	Michie Stadium; West Point, NY	CBSSN	W 60–3	28,290	
December 10	3:00 p.m.	vs. No. 25 Navy	M&T Bank Stadium; Baltimore, MD (Army–Navy Game, Commander-in-Chief's Trophy, College GameDay)	CBS	W 21–17	71,600	
December 27	11:00 a.m.	vs. North Texas	Cotton Bowl; Dallas, TX (Heart of Dallas Bowl)	ESPN	W 38–31 ^{OT}	39,117	
Rankings from AP Poll and CFP Rankings after November 1 released prior to game; All times are in Eastern time

== Game summaries ==
=== At Temple ===
Army Black Knights at Temple Owls

Quarter	1	2	3	4	Total
Black Knights	0	7	7	14	28
Owls	0	10	3	0	13

at Lincoln Financial Field, Philadelphia, PA

- Date: September 3, 2016
- Game time: 7:00 p.m. EDT
- Game weather: Temperature: 79 F • Wind: NNE 8 mph • Weather: Cloudy
- Game attendance: 34,005
- Referee: Adam Savoie
- TV announcers (CBSSN): Dave Ryan (Play-by-play), Corey Chavous (color) & Melanie Collins (sideline)
- ESPN – Army racks up 329 rushing yards to beat Temple 28–13 /// Box Score, Army vs Temple

Game information

First quarter

no scoring

Second quarter

- (14:32) TEM TD: Ryquell Armstead 6-yard rush (Austin Jones kick); 8 plays, 80 yards, 3:59
- (09:00) ARMY TD: Ahmad Bradshaw 10-yard rush (Mitchell Howard kick); 12 plays, 75 yards, 5:32
- (02:51) TEM FG: Austin Jones 41-yard field goal; 4 plays, −1 yard, 0:46

Third quarter

- (08:18) ARMY TD: Andy Davidson 3-yard rush (Mitchell Howard kick); 12 plays, 77 yards, 6:42
- (01:29) TEM FG: Austin Jones 27-yard field goal; 14 plays, 65 yards, 6:49

Fourth quarter

- (09:38) ARMY TD: Tyler Campbell 12-yard rush (Mitchell Howard kick); 14 plays, 81 yards, 6:45
- (02:28) ARMY TD: Andy Davidson 17-yard rush (Mitchell Howard kick); 2 plays, 36 yards, 0:43

Passing

- ARMY – Ahmad Bradshaw: 1/4, 11 yds
- TEM – Phillip Walker: 12/26, 168 yds, 3 INT

Rushing

- ARMY – Andy Davidson: 22 att, 121 yds, 2 TD
- TEM – Ryquell Armstead: 16 att, 77 yds, 1 TD

Receiving

- ARMY – Edgar Allen Poe: 1 rec, 11 yds
- TEM – Marshall Ellick: 4 rec, 46 yds

=== Rice ===
Rice Owls at Army Black Knights

Quarter	1	2	3	4	Total
Owls	7	0	7	0	14
Black Knights	14	7	7	3	31

at Michie Stadium, West Point, NY

- Date: September 10, 2016
- Game time: 12:00 p.m. EDT
- Game weather: Temperature: 82 F • Wind: SSE 7 mph • Weather: Cloudy
- Game attendance: 27,013
- Referee: Gary Patterson
- TV announcers (CBSSN): Ben Holden (Play-by-play), Jay Feely (color) & John Schriffen (sideline)
- ESPN – Davidson scores 3 TDs, Army beats Rice 31–14 /// Box Score, Army vs Rice

Game information

First quarter

- (14:00) RICE TD: Connor Cella 64-yard pass from Tyler Stehling (Haden Tobola kick); 3 plays, 75 yards, 1:00
- (11:02) ARMY TD: Darnell Woolfolk 6-yard rush (Mitchell Howard kick); 6 plays, 75 yards, 2:50
- (00:43) ARMY TD: Andy Davidson 13-yard rush (Mitchell Howard kick); 13 plays, 84 yards, 7:02

Second quarter

- (04:16) ARMY TD: Andy Davidson 2-yard rush (Mitchell Howard kick); 7 plays, 35 yards, 3:30

Third quarter

- (08:02) RICE TD: Austin Walter 37-yard rush (Haden Tobola kick); 1 play, 37 yards, 0:08
- (04:21) ARMY TD: Andy Davidson 3-yard rush (Mitchell Howard kick); 8 plays, 75 yards, 3:41

Fourth quarter

- (08:32) ARMY FG: Mitchell Howard 23-yard field goal; 4 plays, 7 yards, 1:58

Passing

- RICE – Tyler Stehling: 16/30, 197 yds, 1 TD, 1 INT
- ARMY – Ahmad Bradshaw: 3/5, 55 yds

Rushing

- RICE – Darik Dillard: 8 att, 52 yds
- ARMY – Andy Davidson: 23 att, 107 yds, 3 TD

Receiving

- RICE – Connor Cella: 2 rec, 69 yds, 1 TD
- ARMY – Edgar Allen Poe: 2 rec, 46 yds

=== At UTEP ===
Army Black Knights at UTEP Miners

Quarter	1	2	3	4	Total
Black Knights	3	21	28	14	66
Miners	0	0	14	0	14

at Sun Bowl, El Paso, TX

- Date: September 17, 2016
- Game time: 5:00 p.m. MDT
- Game weather: Temperature: 92 F • Wind: W 8 mph • Weather: Sunny
- Game attendance: 37,893
- Referee: Steve LaMantia
- TV announcers (ASN): Dave Armstrong (Play-by-play) & Richard Baldinger (color)
- ESPN – Army improves to 3–0 with 66–14 victory over UTEP /// Box Score, Army vs UTEP

Game information

First quarter

- (07:10) ARMY FG: Mitchell Howard 27-yard field goal; 14 plays, 65 yards, 7:50

Second quarter

- (13:45) ARMY TD: Darnell Woolfolk 9-yard rush (Mitchell Howard kick); 12 plays, 80 yards, 5:30
- (07:42) ARMY TD: Chris Carter 2-yard rush (Mitchell Howard kick); 8 plays, 60 yards, 3:46
- (00:09) ARMY TD: Jordan Asberry 2-yard rush (Mitchell Howard kick); 12 plays, 82 yards, 5:27

Third quarter

- (12:36) ARMY TD: Andy Davidson 33-yard rush (Mitchell Howard kick); 2 plays, 54 yards, 1:11
- (12:27) ARMY TD: Max Regan 13-yard fumble return (Mitchell Howard kick)
- (11:37) UTEP TD: Aaron Jones 24-yard rush (Jay Mattox kick); 2 plays, 46 yards, 0:40
- (06:34) ARMY TD: Darnell Woolfolk 1-yard rush (Mitchell Howard kick); 9 plays, 75 yards, 5:03
- (03:36) UTEP TD: Hayden Plinke 3-yard pass from Zack Greenlee (Jay Mattox kick); 7 plays, 91 yards, 2:51
- (00:43) ARMY TD: Darnell Woolfolk 8-yard rush (Blake Wilson kick); 7 plays, 75 yards, 2:53

Fourth quarter

- (10:48) Joe Walker 39-yard pass from Malik McGue (Blake Wilson); 7 plays, 71 yards, 3:59
- (05:32) Elijah St. Hilaire 2-yard rush (Blake Wilson kick); 6 plays, 32 yards, 3:28

Passing

- ARMY – Ahmad Bradshaw: 3/4, 64 yds
- UTEP – Zack Greenlee: 9/17, 144 yds, 1 TD

Rushing

- ARMY – Andy Davidson: 17 att, 106 yds, 1 TD
- UTEP – Aaron Jones: 11 att, 67 yds, 1 TD

Receiving

- ARMY – Joe Walker: 1 rec, 39 yds, 1 TD
- UTEP – Tyler Batson: 2 rec, 61 yds

=== At Buffalo ===
Army Black Knights at Buffalo Bulls

Quarter	1	2	3	4	OT	Total
Black Knights	7	3	10	0	0	20
Bulls	0	0	6	14	3	23

at UB Stadium, Amherst, NY

- Date: September 24, 2016
- Game time: 7:00 p.m. EDT
- Game weather: Temperature: 62 F • Wind: NNE 9 mph • Weather: Clear, falling temps
- Game attendance: 19,217
- Referee: Mark Kluczynski
- TV announcers (ESPN3): Doug Sherman (Play-by-play) & Dustin Fox (color)
- ESPN – Buffalo comes back to beat Army 23–20 in OT /// Box Score, Army vs Buffalo

Game information

First quarter

- (09:34) ARMY TD: Jordan Asberry 15-yard rush (Blake Wilson kick); 9 plays, 71 yards, 4:15

Second quarter

- (11:27) ARMY FG: Blake Wilson 21-yard field goal; 14 plays, 80 yards, 7:08

Third quarter

- (10:48) UB TD: Tyree Jackson 1-yard rush (Adam Mitcheson kick failed); 6 plays, 23 yards, 2:12
- (07:53) ARMY FG: Blake Wilson 38-yard field goal; 7 plays, 55 yards, 2:45
- (01:25) ARMY TD: Ahmad Bradshaw 5-yard rush (Blake Wilson kick); 11 plays, 62 yards, 5:25

Fourth quarter

- (08:25) UB TD: Kamathi Holsey 5-yard pass from Tyree Jackson (Adam Mitcheson kick); 8 plays, 66 yards, 3:05
- (02:26) UB TD: Tyree Jackson 1-yard rush (Adam Mitcheson kick); 13 plays, 62 yards, 3:47

Overtime

- UB FG: Adam Mitcheson 33-yard field goal; 5 plays, 10 yards

Passing

- ARMY – Ahmad Bradshaw: 3/8, 36 yds
- UB – Tyree Jackson: 20/31, 178 yds, 1 TD, 1 INT

Rushing

- ARMY – Ahmad Bradshaw: 22 att, 126 yds, 1 TD
- UB – Johnat Hawkins: 10 att, 37 yds

Receiving

- ARMY – Christian Poe: 1 rec, 23 yds
- UB – Marcus McGill: 2 rec, 63 yds

=== At Duke ===
Army Black Knights at Duke Blue Devils

Quarter	1	2	3	4	Total
Black Knights	0	6	0	0	6
Blue Devils	7	6	0	0	13

at Wallace Wade Stadium, Durham, NC

- Date: October 8, 2016
- Game time: 3:30 p.m. EDT
- Game weather: Temperature: 68 F • Wind: NNE 19 mph • Weather: Rain, Wind Gusts
- Game attendance: 20,613
- Referee: David Epperley
- TV announcers (ACCN): Wes Durham (Play-by-play), James Bates (color), & Niki Noto (sideline)
- ESPN – Duke edges Army 13–6 in wind and rain from Hurricane Matthew /// Box Score, Army vs Duke

Game information

First quarter

- (07:54) DUKE TD: Erich Schneider 3-yard pass from Parker Boehme (AJ Reed kick); 3 plays, 9 yards, 1:04

Second quarter

- (10:22) DUKE TD: Aaron Young 22-yard pass from Daniel Jones (Danny Stirt rush failed); 6 plays, 32 yards, 3:22
- (02:11) ARMY TD: Andy Davidson 45-yard rush (Blake Wilson rush failed); 2 plays, 56 yards, 0:49

Third quarter

no scoring

Fourth quarter

no scoring

Passing

- ARMY – Ahmad Bradshaw: 2/8, 38 yds, 1 INT
- DUKE – Daniel Jones: 7/15, 41 yds, 1 TD

Rushing

- ARMY – Andy Davidson: 16 att, 120 yds, 1 TD
- DUKE – Daniel Jones: 21 att, 55 yds

Receiving

- ARMY – Christian Poe: 3 rec, 49 yds
- DUKE – Aaron Young: 1 rec, 22 yds, 1 TD

=== Lafayette ===
Lafayette Leopards at Army Black Knights

Quarter	1	2	3	4	Total
Leopards	0	7	0	0	7
Black Knights	14	21	14	13	62

at Michie Stadium, West Point, NY

- Date: October 15, 2016
- Game time: 12:00 p.m. EDT
- Game weather: Temperature: 58 F • Wind: SSE 5 mph • Weather: Sunny
- Game attendance: 38,394
- Referee: Jeff Maconaghy
- TV announcers (CBSSN): Ben Holden (Play-by-play), Jay Feely (color), & John Schriffen (sideline)
- ESPN – Army racks up 671 yards of offense, dominates Lafayette 62–7 /// Box Score, Lafayette vs Army

Game information

First quarter

- (10:15) ARMY TD: Ahmad Bradshaw 60-yard rush (Blake Wilson kick); 4 plays, 88 yards, 1:49
- (02:30) ARMY TD: Jordan Asberry 20-yard rush (Blake Wilson kick); 8 plays, 50 yards, 4:19

Second quarter

- (12:18) ARMY TD: Chris Carter 19-yard rush (Blake Wilson kick); 7 plays, 64 yards, 2:53
- (08:57) ARMY TD: Jeff Ejekam 7-yard pass from Ahmad Bradshaw (Blake Wilson kick); 5 plays, 79 yards, 2:02
- (05:39) ARMY TD: Jordan Asberry 59-yard pass from Chris Carter (Blake Wilson kick); 1 play, 59 yards, 0:10
- (02:56) LAFAYETTE TD: Drew Reed 5-yard rush (Jacob Bissell kick); 7 plays, 75 yards, 2:43

Third quarter

- (09:07) ARMY TD: Cole Macek 4-yard rush (Blake Wilson kick); 12 plays, 75 yards, 5:53
- (03:59) ARMY TD: Joe Walker 20-yard pass from Chris Carter (Blake Wilson kick); 9 plays, 78 yards, 4:06

Fourth quarter

- (07:50) ARMY TD: Kevin Hicks 5-yard rush (Blake Wilson kick blocked); 10 plays, 75 yards, 6:12
- (02:55) ARMY TD: Malik McGue 41-yard rush (Avery Walas kick); 4 plays, 54 yards, 1:50

Passing

- LAFAYETTE – Drew Reed: 21/36, 205 yds, 2 INT
- ARMY – Chris Carter: 4/9, 103 yds, 2 TD

Rushing

- LAFAYETTE – DeSean Brown: 7 att, 10 yds
- ARMY – Cole Macek: 17 att, 111, 1 TD

Receiving

- LAFAYETTE – Matt Mrazek: 9 rec, 85 yds
- ARMY – Jordan Asberry: 1 rec, 59 yds, 1 TD

=== North Texas ===
North Texas Mean Green at Army Black Knights

Quarter	1	2	3	4	Total
Mean Green	14	0	14	7	35
Black Knights	7	3	8	0	18

at Michie Stadium • West Point, NY

- Date: October 22, 2016
- Game time: 12:00 p.m. EDT
- Game weather: Temperature: 48 F • Wind: NW 18 mph • Weather: Light rain
- Game attendance: 31,127
- Referee: Jerry Magallanes
- TV announcers (CBSSN): Ben Holden (Play-by-play), Jay Feely (color), & John Schriffen (sideline)
- ESPN – Jeffrey Wilson scores 3 times, North Texas beats Army 35–18 /// Box Score, North Texas vs Army

Game information

First Quarter

- (07:38) ARMY TD: Darnell Woolfolk 9-yard rush (Blake Wilson kick); 11 plays, 58 yards, 5:20
- (05:38) NT TD: Terian Goree 34-yard pass from Mason Fine (Trevor Moore kick); 7 plays, 76 yards, 1:59
- (04:57) NT TD: Eric Jenkins 34-yard interception return (Trevor Moore kick)

Second Quarter

- (13:28) ARMY FG: Blake Wilson 39-yard field goal; 14 plays, 70 yards, 6:15

Third Quarter

- (13:28) NT TD: Jeffrey Wilson 41-yard rush (Trevor Moore kick); 3 plays, 67 yards, 1:30
- (07:33) NT TD: Jeffrey Wilson 1-yard rush (Trevor Moore kick); 7 plays, 50 yards, 3:26
- (01:14) ARMY TD: Ahmad Bradshaw 6-yard rush (Ahmad Bradshaw rush for 2-pt conversion); 13 plays, 70 yards, 6:19

Fourth Quarter

- (05:58) NT TD: Jeffrey Wilson 1-yard rush (Trevor Moore kick); 7 plays, 88 yards, 3:36

Passing

- NT – Mason Fine: 9/17, 118 yds, 1 TD, 1 INT
- ARMY – Ahmad Bradshaw: 7/21, 94 yds, 4 INT

Rushing

- NT – Jeffrey Wilson: 15 att, 160 yds, 3 TD
- ARMY – Ahmad Bradshaw: 24 att, 90 yds, 1 TD

Receiving

- NT – Terian Goree: 2 rec, 41 yds, 1 TD
- ARMY – D. Mendenhall: 1 rec, 39 yds

=== At Wake Forest ===
Army Black Knights at Wake Forest Demon Deacons

Quarter	1	2	3	4	Total
Black Knights	7	0	0	14	21
Demon Deacons	0	7	3	3	13

at BB&T Field, Winston–Salem, North Carolina

- Date: October 29, 2016
- Game time: 3:30 p.m. EDT
- Game weather: Temperature: 76 F • Wind: SW 4 mph • Weather: Clear
- Game attendance: 27,948
- Referee: David Epperley
- TV announcers (ACCN): James Bates (Play-by-play), Takeo Spikes (color), & Kelsey Wingert (sideline)
- ESPN – Bradshaw, Woolfolk TDs help Army beat Wake Forest 21–13 /// Box Score, Army vs Wake Forest

Game information

First quarter

- (07:54) ARMY TD: Edgar Allen Poe 43-yard pass from Ahmad Bradshaw (Blake Wilson kick); 1 play, 43 yards, 0:08

Second quarter

- (07:43) WF TD: Tabari Hines 3-yard pass from John Wolford (Mike Weaver kick); 9 plays, 69 yards, 3:06

Third quarter

- (12:02) WF FG: Mike Weaver 37-yard field goal; 7 plays, 16 yards, 1:51

Fourth quarter

- (11:45) ARMY TD: Ahmad Bradshaw 11-yard rush (Blake Wilson kick); 9 plays, 88 yards, 4:00
- (02:54) ARMY TD: Darnell Woolfolk 6-yard rush (Blake Wilson kick); 12 plays, 60 yards, 6:31
- (01:25) WF FG: Mike Weaver 34-yard field goal; 10 plays, 49 yards, 1:29

Passing

- ARMY – Ahmad Bradshaw: 6/8, 145 yds, 1 TD, 1 INT
- WF – John Wolford: 23/43, 220 yds, 1 TD, 3 INT

Rushing

- ARMY – Ahmad Bradshaw: 27 att, 65 yds, 1 TD
- WF – John Wolford: 10 att, 66 yds

Receiving

- ARMY – Edgar Allen Poe: 4 rec, 122 yds, 1 TD
- WF – Tabari Hines: 7 rec, 79 yds, 1 TD

=== Air Force ===
Air Force Falcons at Army Black Knights

Quarter	1	2	3	4	Total
Falcons	0	10	14	7	31
Black Knights	0	6	6	0	12

at Michie Stadium, West Point, NY

- Date: November 5, 2016
- Game time: 12:00 p.m. EDT
- Game weather: Temperature: 55 F • Wind: WNW 9 mph • Weather: Sunny
- Game attendance: 38,443
- Referee: Reggie Smith
- TV announcers (CBSSN): Ben Holden (Play-by-play), Jay Feely (color), & Jill Savage (sideline)
- ESPN – Worthman lifts Air Force over Army 31–12 /// Box Score, Air Force vs Army

Game information

First quarter

no scoring

Second quarter

- (07:39) AF FG: Luke Strebel 20-yard field goal; 10 plays, 77 yards, 4:21
- (04:34) AF TD: Shayne Davern 17-yard rush (Luke Strebel kick); 3 plays, 55 yards, 0:59
- (01:19) ARMY TD: Kell Walker 32-yard rush (Black Wilson kick blocked); 6 plays, 65 yards, 3:15

Third quarter

- (11:31) AF TD: Jacobi Owens 46-yard pass from Arion Worthman (Luke Strebel kick); 7 plays, 70 yards, 3:23
- (05:55) ARMY TD: Edgar Allen Poe 14-yard pass from Ahmad Bradshaw (Ahmad Bradshaw pass failed); 10 plays, 76 yards, 5:24
- (03:34) AF TD: Timothy McVey 4-yard rush (Luke Strebel kick); 6 plays, 75 yards, 2:21

Fourth quarter

- (08:50) AF TD: Arion Worthman 4-yard rush (Luke Strebel kick); 6 plays, 55 yards, 2:34

Passing

- AF – Arion Worthman: 6/9, 195 yds, 1 TD
- ARMY – Ahmad Bradshaw: 5/15, 84 yds, 1 TD, 2 INT

Rushing

- AF – Jacobi Owens: 12 att, 106 yds
- ARMY – Andy Davidson: 10 att, 45 yds

Receiving

- AF – Jalen Robinette: 3 rec, 104 yds
- ARMY – Edgar Allen Poe: 3 rec, 46 yds, 1 TD

=== Vs. Notre Dame ===
Army Black Knights vs. Notre Dame Fighting Irish

Quarter	1	2	3	4	Total
Black Knights	0	6	0	0	6
Fighting Irish	21	17	6	0	44

at Alamodome, San Antonio, Texas

- Date: November 12, 2016
- Game time: 2:30 p.m. CST
- Game weather: Temperature: 74 F • Wind: n/a • Weather: Indoors
- Game attendance: 45,762
- Referee: Stuart Mullins
- TV announcers (NBC): Dan Hicks (Play-by-play), Doug Flutie (color), & Kathryn Tappen (sideline)
- ESPN – Kizer leads Notre Dame past Army with ease, 44–6 /// Box Score, Army vs Notre Dame

Game information

First quarter

- (14:48) ND TD: C. J. Sanders 92-yard kickoff return (Justin Yoon kick)
- (10:00) ND TD: Kevin Stepherson 37-yard pass from DeShone Kizer (Justin Yoon kick); 5 plays, 71 yards, 2:42
- (03:44) ND TD: Josh Adams 2-yard rush (Justin Yoon kick); 8 plays, 44 yards, 3:35

Second quarter

- (14:14) ARMY TD: Kell Walker 2-yard rush (Mitchell Howard kick failed); 9 plays, 63 yards, 4:30
- (09:34) ND TD: Durham Smythe 10-yard pass from DeShone Kizer (Justin Yoon kick); 9 plays, 71 yards, 4:40
- (03:39) ND FG: Justin Yoon 27-yard field goal; 9 plays, 49 yards, 4:22
- (00:37) ND TD: Durham Smythe 31-yard pass from DeShone Kizer (Justin Yoon kick); 7 plays, 48 yards, 0:59

Third quarter

- (00:54) ND TD: Tarean Folston 4-yard rush (Justin Yoon kick failed); 5 plays, 37 yards, 1:39

Fourth quarter

no scoring

Passing

- ARMY – Malik McGue: 2/3, 13 yds, 1 INT
- ND – DeShone Kizer: 17/28, 209 yds, 3 TD, 1 INT

Rushing

- ARMY – Darnell Woolfolk: 11 att, 95 yds
- ND – Tarean Folston: 13 att, 84 yds, 1 TD

Receiving

- ARMY – Christian Poe: 1 rec, 9 yds
- ND – Kevin Stepherson: 5 rec, 75 yds, 1 TD

=== Morgan State ===
Morgan State Bears at Army Black Knights

Quarter	1	2	3	4	Total
Bears	0	3	0	0	3
Black Knights	13	16	10	21	60

at Michie Stadium, West Point, New York

- Date: November 19, 2016
- Game time: 12:00 p.m. EST
- Game weather: Temperature: 59 F • Wind: SSE 8 mph • Weather: Sunny
- Game attendance: 28,290
- Referee: Ron Cherry
- TV announcers (CBSSN): Ben Holden (Play-by-play), Jay Feely (color), John Schriffen (sideline)
- ESPN – Army dominates on both sides in 60–3 win over Morgan State /// Box Score, Morgan State vs Army

Game information

First quarter

- (09:26) ARMY TD: Andy Davidson 23-yard rush (Blake Wilson kick); 8 plays, 60 yards, 3:49
- (06:58) ARMY TD: Ahmad Bradshaw 5-yard rush (Blake Wilson kick failed); 3 plays, 47 yards, 0:40

Second quarter

- (09:25) MSU FG: Alex Raya 24-yard field goal; 7 plays, 12 yards, 2:18
- (02:45) ARMY TD: Jordan Asberry 50-yard rush (Ahmad Bradshaw rush for 2-pt conversion); 6 plays, 73 yards, 2:49
- (00:23) ARMY TD: Edgar Allen Poe 31-yard pass from Ahmad Bradshaw (Andy Davidson rush for 2-pt conversion); 4 plays, 49 yards, 1:26

Third quarter

- (09:50) ARMY TD: Darnell Woolfolk 27-yard rush (Blake Wilson kick); 11 plays, 86 yards, 5:01
- (02:57) ARMY FG: Blake Wilson 47-yard field goal; 9 plays, 21 yards, 4:00

Fourth quarter

- (14:33) ARMY TD: Andy Davidson 19-yard rush (Avery Walas kick); 5 plays, 60 yards, 1:38
- (08:30) ARMY TD: Cole Macek 56-yard rush (Mitchell Howard kick); 2 plays, 68 yards, 0:49
- (00:43) ARMY TD: Cole Macek 19-yard rush (Mitchell Howard kick); 11 plays, 83 yards, 5:12

Passing

- MSU – Chris Andrews: 8/20, 79 yds
- ARMY – Ahmad Bradshaw: 3/7, 57 yds, 1 TD

Rushing

- MSU – Lamont Brown III: 11 att, 20 yds
- ARMY – Andy Davidson: 18 att, 111 yds, 2 TD

Receiving

- MSU – Landon Malbrough: 4 rec, 34 yds
- ARMY – Edgar Allen Poe: 2 rec, 47 yds, 1 TD

=== Vs. Navy ===
Army Black Knights vs. #25 (CFP) Navy Midshipmen (117th Army-Navy Game)

Quarter	1	2	3	4	Total
No. 25 (CFP) Midshipmen	0	0	10	7	17
Black Knights	7	7	0	7	21

at M&T Bank Stadium, Baltimore, Maryland

- Date: December 10, 2017
- Game time: 3:00 p.m. EST
- Game weather: Temperature: 36 F • Wind: W 11 mph • Weather: Sunny
- Game attendance: 71,600
- Referee: Stuart Mullins
- TV announcers (CBS): Verne Lundquist (Play-by-play), Gary Danielson (color), & Allie LaForce (sideline)
- ESPN – Army ends 14-year losing streak against Navy /// Box Score, Army vs Navy (117th Army-Navy Game)

Game information

First quarter

- (04:23) ARMY TD: Andy Davidson 1-yard rush (Blake Wilson kick); 14 plays, 66 yards, 7:39

Second quarter

- (07:12) ARMY TD: Andy Davidson 1-yard rush (Blake Wilson kick); 11 plays, 46 yards, 6:15

Third quarter

- (11:23) NAVY TD: Zach Abey 1-yard rush (Bennett Moehring kick); 6 plays, 32 yards, 2:45
- (03:59) NAVY FG: Bennett Moehring 28-yard field goal; 10 plays, 54 yards, 5:20

Fourth quarter

- (12:42) NAVY TD: Zach Abey 41-yard rush (Bennett Moehring kick); 2 plays 53 yards, 0:47
- (06:00) ARMY TD: Ahmad Bradshaw 9-yard rush (Blake Wilson kick); 12 plays, 80 yards, 6:42

Passing

- NAVY – Zach Abey: 6/10, 89 yds, 2 INT
- ARMY – Ahmad Bradshaw: 2/4, 35 yds, 1 INT

Rushing

- NAVY – Zach Abey: 19 att, 73 yds, 2 TD
- ARMY – Kell Walker: 16 att, 94 yds

Receiving

- NAVY – Jamir Tillman: 3 rec, 33 yds
- ARMY – Edgar Allen Poe: 1 rec, 29 yds

=== Vs. North Texas – Heart of Dallas Bowl ===
Army Black Knights vs. North Texas Mean Green (2016 Zaxby's Heart of Dallas Bowl)

Quarter	1	2	3	4	OT	Total
Black Knights	12	12	7	0	7	38
Mean Green	7	14	7	3	0	31

at Cotton Bowl • Dallas, TX

- Date: December 27, 2016
- Game time: 11:00 a.m. CST
- Game weather: Temperature: 57 F • Wind: NW 3 mph • Weather: Mostly cloudy
- Game attendance: 39,117
- Referee: Hubert Owens
- TV announcers (ESPN): Allen Bestwick (Play-by-play), Mike Bellotti (color), & Kris Budden (sideline)
- ESPN – Army rushes past North Texas in OT at Heart of Dallas Bowl /// Box Score, Army vs North Texas (2016 Zaxby's Heart of Dallas Bowl)

Game information

First Quarter

- (09:18) ARMY TD: Darnell Woolfolk 5-yard rush (Blake Wilson kick failed); 11 plays, 75 yards, 5:42
- (06:35) NT TD: Jeffery Wilson 22-yard rush (Trevor Moore kick); 6 plays, 66 yards, 2:37
- (04:56) ARMY TD: Tyler Campbell 70-yard rush (Kell Walker rush failed); 3 plays, 76 yards, 1:34

Second Quarter

- (13:05) ARMY TD: Darnell Woolfolk 1-yard rush (Ahmad Bradshaw rush fumbled); 10 plays, 67 yards 5:14
- (06:37) ARMY TD: Andy Davidson 6-yard rush (D. Mendenhall pass failed); 9 plays, 93 yards, 4:10
- (02:26) NT TD: Jeffery Wilson 22-yard pass from Alec Morris (Trevor Moore kick); 9 plays, 83 yards, 4:02
- (00:10) NT TD: Rico Bussey 27-yard pass from Alec Morris (Trevor Moore kick); 6 plays, 68 yards, 1:40

Third Quarter

- (07:41) ARMY TD: Ahmad Bradshaw 65-yard rush (Blake Wilson kick); 6 plays, 84 yards, 3:05
- (00:45) NT TD: Tyler Wilson 17-yard pass from Alec Morris (Trevor Moore kick); 1 play, 18 yards, 0:05

Fourth Quarter

- (00:28) NT FG: Trevor Moore 37-yard field goal; 11 plays, 50 yards, 1:50

Overtime

- ARMY TD: Jordan Asberry 3-yard rush (Blake Wilson kick); 7 plays, 25 yards

Passing

- ARMY – Ahmad Bradshaw: 2/3, 53 yds
- NT – Alec Morris: 26/38, 304 yds, 3 TD, 1 INT

Rushing

- ARMY – Ahmad Bradshaw: 18 att, 129 yds, 1 TD
- NT – Jeffery Wilson: 20 att, 81 yds, 1 TD

Receiving

- ARMY – Tyler Campbell: 1 rec, 38 yds
- NT – Tyler Wilson: 5 rec, 81 yds, 1 TD

== Personnel ==
=== Roster ===
2016 Army Black Knights Football
Quarterback: 2 Joey Benden – freshman (5'10, 188); 4 Kelvin Hopkins Jr. – freshman (5'10, 202); 7 Chris Carter – sophomore (5'11, 183); 9 Luke Langdon – sophomore (5'10, 187); 11 Malik McGue – freshman (5'8, 174); 13 Korie Frausto – freshman (6'0, 187); 17 Ahmad Bradshaw – junior (5'11, 198); Running backs: 3 Jordan Asberry – sophomore (5'9, 191); 5 Joe Walker – senior (6'0, 204); 6 John Trainor – junior (5'11, 190); 8 Christian Drake – sophomore (5'10, 177); 10 Kjetil Cline – freshman (6'0, 196); 20 Spencer Sheff – sophomore (5'11, 205); 21 Nick Meunier – freshman (5'8, 175); 22 Tyler Campbell – sophomore (5'11, 184); 23 PaulAndrew Rhoden – senior (6'0, 213); 26 Donovan Franklin – freshman (5'9, 187); 27 Malik Crossdale – sophomore (5'10, 216); 30 Elijah St. Hilaire – senior (5'9, 196); 32 Kell Walker – freshman (5'9, 195); 33 Darnell Woolfolk – sophomore (5'9, 225); 36 Ryan Velez – freshman (5'11, 195); 38 Dejoun Lee – freshman (5'7, 173); 40 Andy Davidson – sophomore (6'2, 220); 44 Kevin Hicks – freshman (5'11, 195); 53 Cole Macek – sophomore (5'11, 220); Tight end: 42 Will Huff – freshman (6'2, 235); 46 Trey Neville – freshman (6'4, 240); 49 Juwan Griffith-James – sophomore (6'1, 238); 85 Quinten Parker – sophomore (6'1, 241); 87 Zach Saum – sophomore (6'5, 200); 88 Joe Corless Jr. – sophomore (6'2, 217); 95 Nick Steinhaus – freshman (6'0, 225); Wide receiver: 14 Shafer Swann – sophomore (6'2, 204); 15 Christian Poe – sophomore (6'3, 190); 45 Dan McFadden – sophomore (6'2, 179); 80 Glen Coates – freshman (6'0, 191); 81 Jeff Ejekam – junior (6'2, 204); 82 Edgar Poe – senior (6'4, 216); 83 Luke Peterman – sophomore (6'4, 205); 84 Jermaine Adams – junior (6'1, 216); 86 Christian Hayes – freshman (6'0, 183); Placekicker: 18 Blake Wilson – junior (5'9, 145); 23 Mitchell Howard – senior (6'1, 192); 96 Avery Walas – freshman; 97 David Cooper – freshman (6'2, 179); 99 Nick Schrage – sophomore (6'0, 174)	Offensive lineman: 50 Alex Herndon – freshman (6'2, 240); 51 Nick Miller – sophomore (6'1, 260); 52 Kyle Wilkins – freshman (6'3, 285); 53 Jeff Panara – sophomore (6'3, 253); 54 Josh Rea – sophomore (6'0, 284); 55 Lofi Tamasese – senior (6'1, 288); 56 Riko Tamasese – sophomore (6'1, 285); 57 Ethan Palelei – sophomore (6'0, 275); 58 Kaveinga Tuitahi – sophomore (6'3, 3300); 59 Mike Johnson – freshman (6'3, 262); 60 Justin Gilbert – senior (6'7, 294); 62 Rick Kurz – sophomore (6'2, 271); 63 Jake Baumert – freshman (6'3, 301); 64 Mike Owens – freshman (6'4, 260); 65 Bryce Holland – junior (6'2, 285); 66 Joshua Boylan – junior (6'2, 280); 67 Joseph Hansbury – sophomore (6'3, 274); 68 Liam McCarthy – freshman (6'2, 264); 69 Grant Kerstens – freshman (6'2, 262); 70 Mike Houghton – junior (6'4, 288); 71 Tyler Young – sophomore (6'2, 280); 72 Colby Enegren – senior (6'2, 279); 73 Noah Utley – freshman (6'4, 245); 74 Austin Schuffert – sophomore (6'2, 270); 75 Jack Sides – freshman (6'2, 271); 76 Tim Gant – sophomore (6'3, 278); 76 Joe Tustin – junior (6'2, 307); 77 Jaxson Deaton – freshman (6'4, 300); 78 Brett Toth – junior (6'6, 276); 79 Cooper Simpson – freshman (6'0, 258); 91 Nick Dabbelt – freshman (6'1, 250); Defensive line: 57 Jordan Smith – senior (6'3, 264); 58 Andrew McLean – junior (6'4, 282); 59 John Voit – junior (6'3, 258); 77 Raymond Wright – junior (6'3, 279); 90 Eddy Ruzga – senior (6'3, 249); 91 Wunmi Oyetuga – sophomore (6'4, 269); 92 Matt Allgor – sophomore (6'2, 238); 93 Rod Stoddard II – freshman (5'11, 282); 96 Emmanuel Aka – sophomore (6'2, 230); 96 Julian Meares – freshman (6'2, 223); 99 Cordarrell Davis – sophomore (6'0, 240); Long snappers: 48 Clay Barton – junior (5'10, 185); 83 Scott Flanick – sophomore (6'2, 235); Punter: 17 Zach Potter – freshman (5'10, 208); 95 Caleb Watkins – freshman (5'10, 167); 98 J.D. Mote – sophomore (6'5, 215)	Linebacker: 11 Andrew King – senior (6'0, 246); 15 Ryan Parker – freshman (6'0, 209); 18 Jake Ellington – freshman (6'3, 218); 19 James Nachtigal – sophomore (6'0, 230); 21 Alex Aukerman – junior (6'1, 242); 25 Marco Carrabotta – freshman (6'0, 241); 30 Hayden Haupt – freshman (6'2, 227); 36 Scott Washle – junior (6'1, 240); 37 Donavan Lynch – freshman (6'0, 205); 39 Jeremy Timpf – senior (6'1, 230); 40 Elijah Payne – freshman (6'1, 213); 42 Calen Holt – sophomore (6'0, 220); 43 Connor Slomka – freshman (6'0, 223); 43 Jacquese Steen – freshman (6'0, 222); 44 Jarrod Jones – sophomore (5'10, 210); 45 Tyler L'Hommedieu – junior (6'0, 214); 47 Samuel Johnson – sophomore (6'2, 241); 49 Jacob Covington – freshman (6'2, 247); 50 Bayle Wolf – junior (6'0, 217); 51 Joe Ryan – freshman (6'1, 213); 52 Ryan Grady III – freshman (6'2, 203); 53 Amadeo West – freshman (6'2, 220); 54 Cole Christiansen – freshman (6'2, 218); 55 Matt Sannella – junior (6'1, 250); 56 Kenneth Brinson – sophomore (6'2, 233); 98 Chandler Ramirez – sophomore (6'0, 229); Defensive backs: 1 Marcus Hyatt – sophomore (5'10, 180); 2 Gibby Gibson – sophomore (6'1, 213); 4 Max Regan – sophomore (6'2, 197); 6 Elijah Riley – freshman (6'0, 208); 7 Jaylon McClinton – freshman (5'10, 192); 9 Xavier Moss – senior (6'2, 204); 10 Gervon Simon – senior (5'11, 203); 14 Jalen Sharp – sophomore (6'1, 182); 16 Rashaad Bolton – freshman (5'11, 222); 17 Steven Johnson – senior (6'0, 191); 20 Rhyan England – junior (5'10, 190); 22 Malik Hancock – freshman (5'8, 160); 23 Jack King – freshman (6'2, 208); 26 Richard Hanson – freshman (5'10, 177); 27 Thai Wright – freshman (5'10, 189); 28 Brandon Jackson – sophomore (6'0, 178); 29 Mike Reynolds – sophomore (5'10, 185); 31 Anthony Battaglia – freshman (6'1, 203); 32 Zach Scott – sophomore (5'10, 159); 33 Boomer Bakich Jr. – sophomore (6'1, 208); 34 Matthew Kaufmann – senior (5'9, 195); 38 Cameron Jones – freshman (6'0, 194); 46 DJ Young Jr. – freshman (5'10, 160); 47 Michel Toure – freshman (6'3, 218)

=== Depth chart ===
Defense

FS
Rhyan England
Max Regan
⋅

WLB	ILB	ILB	SLB
Kenneth Brinson	Jeremy Timpf	Andrew King	Alex Aukerman
James Nachtigal	Calen Holt	Scott Washle	James Gibson
⋅	⋅	⋅	⋅

SS
Xavier Moss
Cameron James
⋅

CB
Marcus Hyatt
Elijah Riley
⋅

DE	NT	DE
Eddy Ruzga	Andrew McLean	John Voit
Wunmi Oyetuga	Raymond Wright	Amadeo West
⋅	Cordarrell Davis	⋅

CB
Brandon Jackson
Mike Reynolds
⋅

Offense

WR
Edgar Poe
Jermaine Adams
⋅

SB
Jordan Asberry
Kell Walker
Joe Walker

LT	LG	C	RG	RT
Rick Kurz	Justin Gilbert	Bryce Holland	Mike Houghton	Brett Toth
Colby Enegren	Jaxson Deaton	Joshua Boylan	Mike Johnson	Austin Schuffert
⋅	Tim Gant	⋅	⋅	⋅

SB
Tyler Campbell
Elijah St. Hilaire
Christian Drake

WR
Jeff Ejekam
Luke Peterman
⋅

QB
Ahmad Bradshaw
Chris Carter
⋅

Key reserves
TE #1 : Quinten Parker
TE #2 : Juwan Griffith-James

FB
Andy Davidson
Darnell Woolfolk
Cole Macek

Special teams
PK Mitchell Howard
P Nick Schrage
KR Tyler Campbell & Elijah St. Hilaire
PR Edgar Poe & Malik McGue
LS Clay Barton
H Ahmad Bradshaw

Depth Chart 2016
True Freshman
Double Position : *
