= Dave Armstrong (sportscaster) =

American television sports announcer

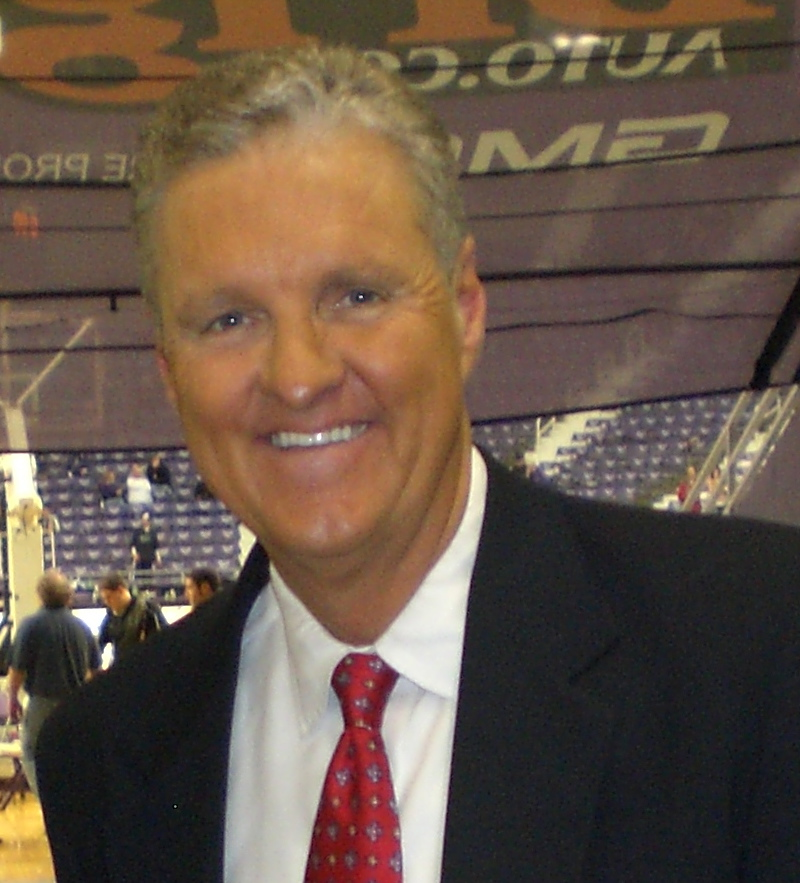
Dave Armstrong Sportscaster

Dave Armstrong (born May 10, 1957, in Detroit, Michigan) is a former American television sports announcer for professional and college sports. He spent nine years as the play-by-play announcer for two Major League Baseball teams (Kansas City Royals and Colorado Rockies), in the NFL he has worked with both the Seattle Seahawks and the Kansas City Chiefs broadcasting regular and pre-season games and also announced several games for the NBA's Denver Nuggets. He also broadcast Big 12 college basketball games for ESPN Regional Television and Big 12 Now and called games in this conference from 1988 up until his retirement in 2022. His signature “Wow!” is known as the exclamation mark on exceptional plays.

== Career ==
Armstrong graduated with a B.A. in Broadcasting from John Brown University and began his career working in radio and television in the Midwest. He served as the program director for KKOY (AM)/FM in Chanute, KS before moving to KAYS-TV in Hays, KS then on to KSNW-TV in Wichita as the Sports Director. During his time with KSNW-TV, he began doing play-by-play for professional soccer and many collegiate sports. In 1988, Armstrong's sports broadcasting career took off when he joined Raycom Sports to do play-by-play for Big 8 (now the Big 12) college basketball. He eventually added nearly every college sport to his list of professional credits: Football, Baseball, Wrestling, Volleyball, Tennis and Track and Field. Armstrong also called the televised games on the Jayhawk Network for the Kansas Jayhawks from 1993 until 2022. He has done play-by-play for ESPN, Prime Network, Fox Sports and the American Sports Network calling games in the Big 12, the Big East, the Big Ten and the ACC.

His professional sports credentials included spending three seasons as the television voice of Major League Baseball's Kansas City Royals (1993–1995) followed by six seasons with the Colorado Rockies (1996–2001). In addition, Armstrong did play-by-play in the NFL with the Seattle Seahawks in 1992 and the Kansas City Chiefs in 2009, as well as in the NBA, when he was a fill-in announcer during the 1996 - 2001 seasons with the Denver Nuggets. Armstrong is a member of the National Sportscasters and Sportswriters Association.

Armstrong retired from broadcasting on November 28, 2022; the last event he called was an 87–55 victory by Kansas over Texas Southern in men's college basketball.

== Other work ==
In addition to his sports announcing work, Armstrong is also an author and speaker. His book, “Driving From Here to Wow: Looking at Life Through the Windshield” (2008), is an inspirational and humorous account of many of his life experiences – both personal and professional. Armstrong also frequently emcees for corporate and charitable events throughout the country, speaks at youth sports camps, does commercial voice work for documentaries and provides the voice for promotional videos developed for corporations and trade associations.

== Legal issues ==
In 2013, Armstrong was charged with assault after getting into a fight at Fred Arbanas Golf Course.
