= Dance For Kindness =

Dance For Kindness was initiated by Life Vest Inside (LVI) in 2012. It is a worldwide event in celebration of World Kindness Day which falls on November 13. Groups from across the globe join together to perform a Kindness Freezmob/Flashmob to the same song, same dance, all happening on the same day. The purpose of Dance for Kindness is to show that regardless of the differences in race, religion, ethnicity culture and background, the common thread that ties us together is kindness.

The Dance for Kindness flagship location is in the heart of NYC, Times Square. The event takes place on the second Sunday of November which usually just follows World Kindness Week.

== Goals ==
The goals of the event are to promote:

- Kindness
- Positive Human Interaction
- Global Unity
- Teamwork
- Leadership
- Positive Self Expression

== Event format ==
DFK Group Leaders: Each city is run by LVI fans that sign up to become a Group Leader in their region. Group Leaders organize the events under the guidance and leadership of Life Vest Inside. The tasks of a group leader range from organizing a location, rehearsals, spreading word about the event, managing registrants who sign up to dance at their location, photo and video coverage during the event.

DFK Anthem Contest: Music is a large component of Dance for Kindness. It also has the most amazing power to uplift, inspire and unite. In the summer of 2014, LVI Founder, Orly Wahba, had an idea to create an original song for Dance for Kindness. She reached out to four artists and asked them to come up with an original song that embodies the purpose of Dance for Kindness. Once the songs were submitted, it was left in the hands of the DFK Group Leaders to vote as to which song would be the official DFK2014 anthem.

Votes were cast and Charles Preston's song, Revolution of Love was chosen as the first original DFK anthem.

Starting in 2015, LVI opened up this opportunity to any and all musicians from around the globe to submit a demo that would be voted on by the public. LVI works with music industry professionals to produce the song to be heard worldwide on the day of Dance for Kindness.

- 2014 DFK Anthem Winner: Charles Preston, Revolution of Love
- 2015 DFK Anthem Winner: Yaakov Feldstein, More Light

Dance for Kindness FlashMob and FreezeMob songs are part of the DFK compilation album Connect. Album proceeds got to further LVI's mission.

== Reach ==
In 2015, several Celebrity Ambassadors joined Life Vest Inside and participated in Dance For Kindness including:

- The Today Show’s, Hoda Kotb
- Peter Scolari
- Rachel Marie Thomas
- Sean O’brien (AKA Dancing Man)

Dance for Kindness has been featured on The Today Show, NBC, CBS, Bloomberg Television, and many other media outlets.

== Stats ==
Dance for Kindness Stats:

- 2012: 15 Countries, 30 cities, 3,500 participants
- 2013: 25 countries, 30 cities, 5,000 participants
- 2014: 30 countries, 80 cities, 10,000 participants
- 2015: 50 countries, 100 cities, 12,000+ participants
