= 2016 Heart of Dallas Bowl =

2016 Zaxby's Heart of Dallas Bowl
- 7th Heart of Dallas Bowl
Army Black Knights	North Texas Mean Green
(7–5)	(5–7)
Independent	C–USA
38	31
Head coach: Jeff Monken	Head coach: Seth Littrell
	1	2	3	4	OT	Total
Army	12	12	7	0	7	38
North Texas	7	14	7	3	0	31
- Date: December 27, 2016
- Season: 2016
- Stadium: Cotton Bowl
- Location: Fair Park; Dallas, Texas
- MVP: Ahmad Bradshaw (QB, Army)
- Favorite: Army by 9.5
- Referee: Hubert Owens (SEC)
- Attendance: 39,117
- Payout: US$1,100,000

United States TV coverage
- Network: ESPN, RedVoice, LLC
- Announcers: Allen Bestwick, Mike Bellotti, Kris Budden (ESPN); Brian Estridge, John Denton, Rob Best, Landry Burdine (RedVoice)

The 2016 Heart of Dallas Bowl was a postseason American college football bowl game played on December 27, 2016, at the Cotton Bowl in Dallas, Texas. The seventh edition of the Heart of Dallas Bowl, the game featured the Army Black Knights, an independent, and the North Texas Mean Green of Conference USA. It was one of the 2016–17 bowl games that concluded the 2016 FBS football season. Sponsored by fast food restaurant Zaxby's, the game was officially known as the Zaxby's Heart of Dallas Bowl. Broadcast on ESPN, Army defeated North Texas by a score of 38–31.

== Teams ==
The game featured the Army Black Knights, an FBS independent, and the North Texas Mean Green from Conference USA. This was the sixth meeting between the schools, with Army entering the game leading the all-time series 4–1. They first met on the football field in 1996, and later met in 1997, 2009, and 2010, all of which were won by Army. North Texas achieved their first victory in the series in their fifth meeting, which came earlier in the regular season on October 22, 2016. It was the first postseason meeting between the two teams.

=== Army ===
After a disappointing 2–10 campaign the year prior, Army looked to return to winning ways in head coach Jeff Monken's third season. Army's season opened on the road in Philadelphia, where they defeated Temple to win their first season-opening road game since 2010. The Black Knights' home opener came the following week, when they hosted and defeated Rice, by a score of 31–14. The following week, Army was back on the road for the start of a three-game away stretch, the first game of which came at UTEP, whom they defeated to achieve their first 3–0 start to a season since 1996. The next two games were not so kind, however; the Black Knights faltered both in games at Buffalo, by three points in overtime, and, after a bye week, at Duke, by seven points. Army improved to 4–2 the next week at home, with their defeat of Lafayette, from the FCS's Patriot League. The following week, they matched up with eventual bowl game foe North Texas, to whom they lost by seventeen points. Army's first and only Power Five win came the next week, as they traveled to Winston-Salem and defeated Wake Forest by eight.

Now sitting at 5–3, they needed to win one of their next two games to ensure bowl eligibility, however they lost both of those games, to Air Force and Notre Dame, respectively, putting them at 5–5 with two contests to go. Army achieved their sixth win of the season on November 19, with a 60–3 victory against Morgan State, but as this was their second win of the year against an FCS opponent, it did not count towards their bowl eligibility (as only one FCS win per year can count towards the six wins traditionally required to be bowl eligible). Ordinarily, this would have meant that Army would be ineligible for postseason play, but as there were eighty bowl slots that were not all able to be filled, 5-win teams were admitted to postseason play based on Academic Progress Rates (APR). Because of this, Army accepted their invitation to play in the Heart of Dallas Bowl on December 4. Incidentally, the Black Knights would go on to upset No. 25 Navy in the Army–Navy Game just six days later, in their first win over the Midshipmen since 2001, thereby granting them enough wins to be traditionally bowl eligible anyway.

This was Army's sixth bowl appearance in school history, their first since the 2010 Armed Forces Bowl. This was also their first appearance in the Heart of Dallas Bowl.

=== North Texas ===
North Texas entered 2016 under the leadership of new head coach Seth Littrell, who was brought in to lead the program after the Mean Green finished 2015 with a record of 1–11. The Mean Green opened the season with a Safeway Bowl matchup against SMU, in which they fell 21–34. They rebounded the next week, defeating Bethune–Cookman by three touchdowns. Their only Power Five game of the season saw them travel to No. 23 Florida, where they were shut out. They pulled back up to .500 with their week four win at Rice, a win that took two overtimes to complete. Again they faltered, this time against Middle Tennessee at home. Now 2–3, North Texas improved their record by doubling their win total over the following three weeks: they defeated Marshall at home, and then traveled to West Point and defeated Army following a bye week.

The next three weeks were not as kind to the Mean Green. A road game against UTSA, a home tilt against Louisiana Tech, and a road matchup with Western Kentucky all resulted in losses for North Texas, putting them at a precarious 4–6. Faced with two remaining regular season games, UNT needed to win both in order to become bowl eligible. They faced Southern Miss in their last home game of the season, and it was a game that resulted in a much-needed six-point win for the Mean Green. Needing a win in their last regular season game against UTEP, North Texas fell behind 7–31 in the second quarter and was never able to recover, losing 24–52. The result of this, as a post-game Associated Press report put it, was that North Texas was "knocked...out of bowl eligibility." However, this did not end up being the case. As was the case with Army (who had a 5–6 record when they were invited), 5–7 North Texas, despite having a losing record, was extended an invitation due to the lack of teams to fill all eighty bowl slots, and their high APR scores. They accepted said invitation on December 4, booking their trip to Dallas for a rematch with the Black Knights.

This was North Texas's ninth bowl appearance in school history, and their second appearance in the Heart of Dallas Bowl. Their last appearance in the game, and their last bowl appearance overall, was in the 2014 Heart of Dallas Bowl played at the conclusion of the 2013 season.

== Game summary ==
=== Scoring summary ===
Scoring summary

Quarter	Time	Drive			Team	Scoring information	Score	
Quarter	Time	Plays	Yards	TOP	Team	Scoring information	ARMY	NT
1	9:18	11	75	5:42	ARMY	Darnell Woolfolk 5-yard touchdown run, Blake Wilson kick no good	6	0
1	6:35	6	66	2:37	NT	Jeffery Wilson 22-yard touchdown run, Trevor Moore kick good	6	7
1	4:56	3	76	1:34	ARMY	Tyler Campbell 70-yard touchdown run, 2-point run failed (Kell Walker run)	12	7
2	13:05	10	67	5:14	ARMY	Darnell Woolfolk 1-yard touchdown run, 2-point run failed (Ahmad Bradshaw run)	18	7
2	6:37	9	93	4:10	ARMY	Andy Davidson 6-yard touchdown run, 2-point pass incomplete (Samuel Johnson pass)	24	7
2	2:26	9	83	4:02	NT	Jeffery Wilson 22-yard touchdown reception from Alec Morris, Trevor Moore kick good	24	14
2	0:10	6	68	1:40	NT	Rico Bussey 27-yard touchdown reception from Alec Morris, Trevor Moore kick good	24	21
3	7:41	6	84	3:05	ARMY	Ahmad Bradshaw 65-yard touchdown run, Blake Wilson kick good	31	21
3	0:45	1	18	0:05	NT	Tyler Wilson 18-yard touchdown reception from Alec Morris, Trevor Moore kick good	31	28
4	0:28	11	50	1:50	NT	37-yard field goal by Trevor Moore	31	31
OT		7	25		ARMY	Jordan Asberry 3-yard touchdown run, Blake Wilson kick good	38	31
"TOP" = time of possession. For other American football terms, see Glossary of American football.							38	31

=== Statistics ===
Statistics	ARMY	NT
First downs	22	19
Third down efficiency	11–17	5–12
Plays-yards	78–533	67–410
Rushes-yards	74–480	27–96
Passing yards	53	314
Passing, Comp-Att-Int	2–4–0	27–40–2
Time of Possession	36:18	23:42

Team	Category	Player	Statistics
Army	Passing	Ahmad Bradshaw	2/3, 53 yards
Army	Rushing	Ahmad Bradshaw	18 carries, 129 yards, 1 TD
Army	Receiving	Tyler Campbell	1 reception, 38 yards
North Texas	Passing	Alec Morris	26/38, 304 yards, 3 TD, 1 INT
North Texas	Rushing	Jeffery Wilson	20 carries, 81 yards, 1 TD
North Texas	Receiving	Turner Smiley	8 receptions, 79 yards

== See also ==
- List of college football post-season games that were rematches of regular season games
