= Kind (surname) =

Kind is a surname. Notable people with the surname include:

- Adolfo Kind (1848–1907), Swiss chemical engineer and one of the fathers of Italian skiing
- Johann Friedrich Kind (1768–1843), German dramatist
- Paolo Kind, Italian ski jumper, son of Adolfo Kind
- Richard Kind (born 1956), American actor
- Arnold Kind (born 1957), Liechtenstein teacher and politician
- Ron Kind (born 1963), U.S. Representative from Wisconsin
