= 2016 UTEP Miners football team =

American college football season

2016 UTEP Miners football
- Conference: Conference USA
- West Division
- Record: 4–8 (2–6 C-USA)
- Head coach: Sean Kugler (4th season)
- Offensive coordinator: Brent Pease (1st season)
- Offensive scheme: Multiple
- Defensive coordinator: Tom Mason (1st season)
- Base defense: 3–4
- Home stadium: Sun Bowl

2016 Conference USA football standings
	Conf.			Overall
Team	W		L	W		L
East Division
Western Kentucky xy$	7	–	1	11	–	3
Old Dominion x	7	–	1	10	–	3
Middle Tennessee	5	–	3	8	–	5
FIU	4	–	4	4	–	8
Charlotte	3	–	5	4	–	8
Marshall	2	–	6	3	–	9
Florida Atlantic	2	–	6	3	–	9
West Division
Louisiana Tech xy	6	–	2	9	–	5
UTSA	5	–	3	6	–	7
Southern Miss	4	–	4	7	–	6
North Texas	3	–	5	5	–	8
Rice	2	–	6	3	–	9
UTEP	2	–	6	4	–	8
Championship: Western Kentucky 58, Louisiana Tech 44
$ – Conference champion; x – Division champion/co-champions; y – Championship game participant; Rankings from AP Poll

The 2016 UTEP Miners football team represented the University of Texas at El Paso (UTEP) as a member of the West Division in Conference USA (C-USA) during the 2016 NCAA Division I FCS football season. Led by fourth-year head coach Sean Kugler, the Miners compiled an overall record of 4–8 with a mark of 2–6 in conference play, tying for fifth place at the bottom of the standings in C-USA's West Division. The team played home games at the Sun Bowl in El Paso, Texas.

UTEP averaged 23,001 fans per game.

== Schedule ==
UTEP announced its 2016 football schedule on February 4, 2016. The 2016 schedule consisted of seven home and five away games.

Date	Time	Opponent	Site	TV	Result	Attendance
September 3	6:00 pm	New Mexico State*	Sun Bowl; El Paso, TX (Battle of I-10)	beIN	W 38–22	30,119
September 10	5:00 pm	at No. 11 Texas*	Darrell K Royal–Texas Memorial Stadium; Austin, TX	LHN	L 7–41	92,683
September 17	5:00 pm	Army*	Sun Bowl; El Paso, TX	ASN	L 14–66	37,893
September 24	6:00 pm	Southern Miss	Sun Bowl; El Paso, TX	CI	L 7–34	21,419
October 1	5:00 pm	at Louisiana Tech	Joe Aillet Stadium; Ruston, LA	ASN	L 7–28	22,101
October 8	6:00 pm	FIU	Sun Bowl; El Paso, TX	CUSA.tv	L 21–35	17,751
October 22	7:00 pm	at UTSA	Alamodome; San Antonio, TX	KMYS	W 52–49 ^{5OT}	23,633
October 29	6:00 pm	Old Dominion^{†}	Sun Bowl; El Paso, TX	CUSA.tv	L 21–31	19,254
November 5	6:00 pm	Houston Baptist*	Sun Bowl; El Paso, TX	CUSA.tv	W 42–10	15,977
November 12	4:00 pm	at Florida Atlantic	FAU Stadium; Boca Raton, FL	CUSA.tv	L 31–35	9,122
November 19	10:00 am	at Rice	Rice Stadium; Houston, TX	ESPN3	L 24–44	19,148
November 26	2:00 pm	North Texas	Sun Bowl; El Paso, TX	CUSA.tv	W 52–24	18,591
*Non-conference game; ^{†}Homecoming; Rankings from AP Poll released prior to the game; All times are in Mountain time

== Game summaries ==
=== New Mexico State ===
	1	2	3	4	Total
Aggies	3	0	13	6	22
Miners	7	17	7	7	38

=== At Texas ===
	1	2	3	4	Total
Miners	0	7	0	0	7
#11 Longhorns	10	10	14	7	41

=== Army ===
	1	2	3	4	Total
Black Knights	3	21	28	14	66
Miners	0	0	14	0	14

=== Southern Miss ===
	1	2	3	4	Total
Golden Eagles	3	21	7	3	34
Miners	7	0	0	0	7

=== At Louisiana Tech ===
	1	2	3	4	Total
Miners	0	0	0	7	7
Bulldogs	14	0	0	14	28

=== FIU ===
	1	2	3	4	Total
Panthers	3	10	15	7	35
Miners	7	0	7	7	21

=== At UTSA ===
	1	2	3	4	OT	2OT	3OT	4OT	5OT	Total
Miners	7	7	14	0	3	7	8	0	6	52
Roadrunners	14	7	7	0	3	7	8	0	3	49

=== Old Dominion ===
	1	2	3	4	Total
Monarchs	10	0	7	14	31
Miners	0	7	6	8	21

=== Houston Baptist ===
	1	2	3	4	Total
Huskies	0	3	7	0	10
Miners	14	14	7	7	42

=== At Florida Atlantic ===
	1	2	3	4	Total
Miners	7	10	7	7	31
Owls	7	10	3	15	35

=== At Rice ===
	1	2	3	4	Total
Miners	3	0	7	14	24
Owls	6	28	7	3	44

=== North Texas ===
	1	2	3	4	Total
Mean Green	7	10	0	7	24
Miners	10	21	14	7	52
