= Sean Kugler =

American football player and coach (born 1966)

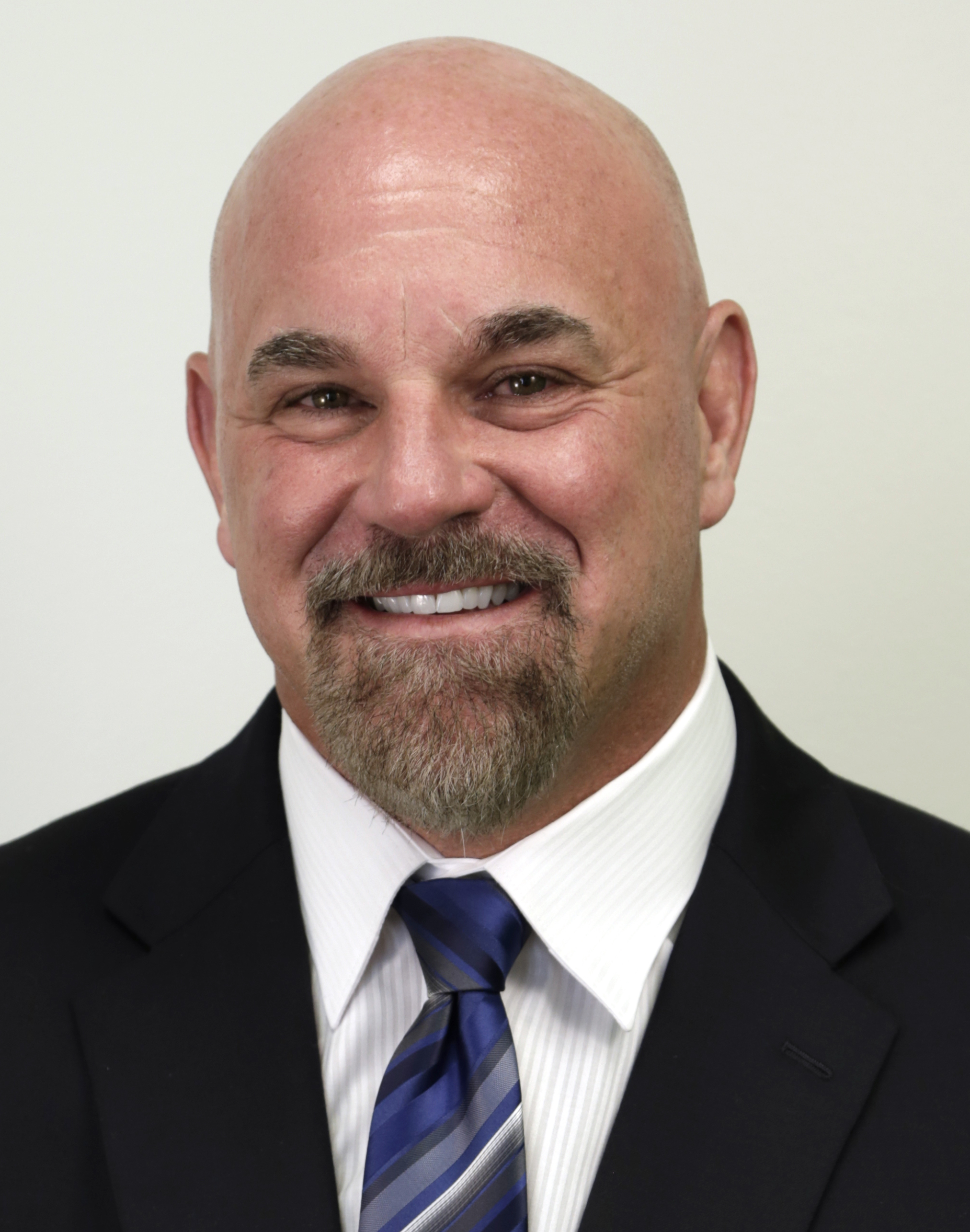
- Kugler in 2014

Personal information
- Born: August 9, 1966 (age 60); Lockport, New York, U.S.

Career information
- College: UTEP

Career history
- Tampa Bay Tech HS (FL) (1990-1991) Offensive line coach & defensive line coach; Gaither HS (FL) (1992) Offensive line coach & strength & conditioning coach; UTEP (1993) Graduate assistant; UTEP (1994) Tight ends coach & assistant strength & conditioning coach; UTEP (1995–2000) Offensive line coach; Detroit Lions (2001–2003) Tight ends coach; Detroit Lions (2004–2005) Offensive line coach & tight ends coach; Boise State (2006) Assistant head coach & offensive line coach; Buffalo Bills (2007) Assistant offensive line coach; Buffalo Bills (2008–2009) Offensive line coach; Pittsburgh Steelers (2010–2012) Offensive line coach; UTEP (2013–2017) Head coach; Denver Broncos (2018) Offensive line coach (guards/centers); Arizona Cardinals (2019–2020) Offensive line coach; Arizona Cardinals (2021–2022) Run game coordinator & offensive line coach; DC Defenders (2024) Offensive line coach

Awards and highlights
- Second-team All-WAC (1988)

Sean Patrick Kugler (born August 9, 1966) is an American football coach who was most recently the offensive line coach for the DC Defenders of the United Football League (UFL). He was previously the head coach at the University of Texas at El Paso (UTEP) from 2013 to 2017. Kugler was an assistant coach in the NFL for the Detroit Lions (2001–2005), Buffalo Bills (2007–2009), Pittsburgh Steelers (2010–2012), Denver Broncos (2018) and Arizona Cardinals (2019–2022).

== Early life ==
Kugler was born and raised in Lockport, New York where his father, Robert, was the assistant fire chief. He has two brothers and two sisters.

== Playing career ==
Kugler attended the University of Texas at El Paso (UTEP) from 1984 to 1988, earning letterman honors in football for all four years. The 1988 team played in the Independence Bowl. His position coach at UTEP was Andy Reid, who would later become head coach of the NFL's Philadelphia Eagles and Kansas City Chiefs.

Kugler signed with the Pittsburgh Steelers as an undrafted free agent in 1989, but after sustaining a concussion in training camp, he was released. In 1991, he was drafted by the Sacramento Surge of the World League of American Football (WLAF). He started at guard for one season with the Surge.

== Coaching career ==
=== Early life ===
Kugler began his coaching career as a graduate assistant coach for Florida high schools Tampa Bay Vo-Tech and Gaither HS while completing his degree in education at the University of South Florida (USF). After three years in Florida, he spent the next eight seasons (1993–2000) at UTEP, working his way from graduate assistant (1993), to tight ends coach in (1994), and finally to offensive line coach (1995–2000).

=== First NFL stint ===
Kugler got his first professional coaching experience in 2001 as a tight end coach with the Detroit Lions of the NFL. He later worked his way into a role as offensive line coach in 2004.

There's absolutely no question that he's the best football coach I've ever been around.

— Boise State head coach Chris Petersen on Kugler

=== Boise State ===
In 2006, Kugler moved to Boise State, assuming a role as assistant head coach and offensive line coach. The 2006 Boise State Broncos football team was the only undefeated team in college football that year, winning the WAC title and beating Oklahoma in the 2007 Fiesta Bowl. They boasted the sixth-ranked rushing performance in the nation behind Kugler's offensive line led by sophomore Ryan Clady and junior Jeff Cavender, who earned All-WAC honors.

=== Second NFL stint ===
Kugler joined the Buffalo Bills in 2007 as assistant offensive line coach. He was promoted to offensive line coach the following year. He quickly improved the Bills' line and mentored tackle Jason Peters to two consecutive Pro Bowl selections. Kugler's units blocked for three consecutive 1,000-yard rushers: Marshawn Lynch (2007-08) and Fred Jackson (2009). The Bills' offensive line surrendered only 26 sacks in 2007, and they maintained the same lineup for 15 consecutive games.

He joined the Pittsburgh Steelers in 2010, replacing offensive line coach, Larry Zierlein. He had previously replaced Zierlein as assistant line coach for the Bills in 2007. In his first season as a coach with the Steelers, the team made it to the Super Bowl despite season-ending injuries to both starting offensive tackles and a rookie starting center. Center Maurkice Pouncey made his first three Pro Bowls under Kugler from 2010-12.

=== UTEP ===
On December 10, 2012, UTEP named Kugler as the new head coach, replacing the retired Mike Price. In addition to leading the Miners to the New Mexico Bowl in 2014, Kugler's team achieved a perfect APR academic score of 1,000 and had the highest GPA and graduation rates in school history. Kugler coached two All-Americans—running back Aaron Jones and guard Will Hernandez—while at UTEP. He resigned during the 2017 season after an 0-5 start.

=== Denver Broncos ===
Kugler was hired by the Denver Broncos on January 2, 2018, to be the offensive line (guards/center) coach.

=== Arizona Cardinals ===
On January 13, 2019, Kugler was hired by the Arizona Cardinals to be their offensive line coach.

On November 20, 2022, Kugler was fired by the Cardinals after Mexican authorities informed the team he had groped a woman while in Mexico City for the team's game against the San Francisco 49ers. Kugler hired a law firm to investigate the allegations and filed a request for arbitration with the NFL.

=== DC Defenders ===
On May 5, 2024, it was revealed the Kugler was hired as the offensive line coach for the DC Defenders of the United Football League (UFL).

== Personal life ==
Kugler has three children: sons Robert and Patrick and daughter Kali, and a stepson, Javi, with wife. Robert and Patrick played on high school football teams that won state championships two straight seasons — in 2009 in New York and 2010 in Pennsylvania. Robert was named the Class AAAA co-Player of the Year by the Pennsylvania Interscholastic Athletic Association, and played college football for the Purdue University Boilermakers from 2011 to 2014, including three seasons as their starting center. His younger son, Patrick, played college football for the University of Michigan Wolverines from 2014 to 2017, including one season as their starting center.

== Head coaching record ==
Year	Team	Overall	Conference	Standing	Bowl/playoffs
UTEP Miners (Conference USA) (2013–2017)
2013	UTEP	2–10	1–7	7th (West)	
2014	UTEP	7–6	5–3	T–2nd (West)	L New Mexico
2015	UTEP	5–7	3–5	T–4th (West)	
2016	UTEP	4–8	2–6	T–5th (West)	
2017	UTEP	0–5	0–1	(West)	
UTEP:		18–36	11–22		
Total:		18–36			
