= Seth Littrell =

American football player and coach (born 1978)

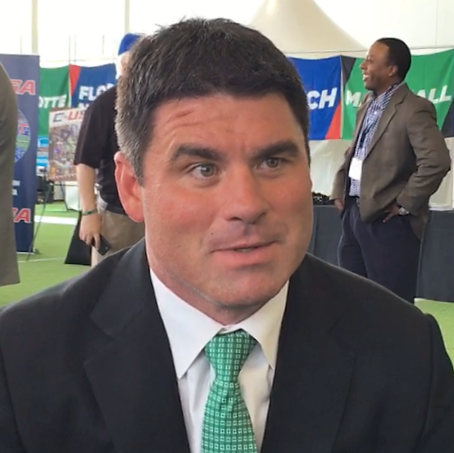
- Littrell at 2018 C-USA Kickoff

Current position
- Title: Senior offensive analyst
- Team: Tennessee
- Conference: SEC

Biographical details
- Born: July 24, 1978 (age 48); Muskogee, Oklahoma, U.S.

Playing career
- 1997–2000: Oklahoma
- Position: Running back

Coaching career (HC unless noted)
- 2002–2004: Kansas (GA)
- 2005–2008: Texas Tech (RB)
- 2009: Arizona (RB/TE)
- 2010: Arizona (co-OC/RB/TE)
- 2011: Arizona (OC/RB/TE)
- 2012–2013: Indiana (OC/FB/TE)
- 2014–2015: North Carolina (AHC/OC/TE)
- 2016–2022: North Texas
- 2023: Oklahoma (OA)
- 2024: Oklahoma (OC/QB)
- 2025–present: Tennessee (senior OA)

Head coaching record
- Overall: 44–44
- Bowls: 0–5

James Seth Littrell (born July 24, 1978) is an American football coach and former player. He is a senior offensive analyst at the University of Tennessee. Littrell served as the head football coach at the University of North Texas from 2016 to 2022. He was the offensive coordinator and quarterbacks coach at the University of Oklahoma for part of the 2024 season.

Littrell attended the University of Oklahoma, where he played four years as a fullback and was a team captain on the Oklahoma Sooners football team that won the 2000 national championship. He graduated in 2001 with a degree in communications and was a member of Sigma Phi Epsilon. His father, Jimmy, also played fullback at OU and won two national championships in 1974 and 1975.

== Early life ==
Littrell was born in Muskogee, Oklahoma, and attended Muskogee High School. He played fullback and linebacker where he rushed for 1,385 yards and 29 touchdowns his senior year. He was named first team all state as a linebacker. He finished his prep career with a total of 3,603 rushing yards and 53 TDs. He was recruited by Oklahoma, Oklahoma State, Tulsa, Arkansas, Kansas State and Texas. Littrell also wrestled and won two 5A state championship at 189 lbs.

== Coaching career ==
=== Early career ===
Littrell started his coaching career as a graduate assistant at Kansas from 2002 to 2004 under Mark Mangino, his former offensive coordinator at Oklahoma.

Under Mike Leach, he was running backs coach at Texas Tech from 2005 to 2008. From 2009 to 2011, Littrell coached the offense at Arizona. Then from 2012 to 2013, Littrell was offensive coordinator and tight ends coach at Indiana. From 2014 to 2015, Littrell was assistant head coach for offense and tight ends coach at North Carolina under Larry Fedora. In Littrell's last season at North Carolina, the team finished 11–3 and first place in the ACC Coastal Division.

=== North Texas ===
On December 5, 2015, Littrell was named the head coach at North Texas. UNT hired Littrell after the Mean Green finished 1-11 in 2015. School officials moved quickly to sign Littrell to an extension following the season through 2021. After his first season which saw the team finish in a bowl game and with a 5–8 record, his second season his team broke through. With great play from future NFL back Jeffrey Wilson, senior Kishawn McClain, and the future program passing leader sophomore Mason Fine, the team finished the season with a 9–5 record. This was the first 9-win season in almost 40 years for UNT and led to another contract extension. The following season Littrell led the Mean Green to a 4–0 start with wins that included a 46–23 win over rival SMU, and a surprising 44–17 win over SEC Arkansas. The team finished again with 9 wins and a third consecutive bowl appearance. Littrell is 0–5 in bowl games with the most recent game coming on December 23, 2021, where UNT lost to Miami (OH) 27–14 in the Frisco Football Classic.

North Texas fired Littrell on December 4, 2022, following a 7–6 season in which North Texas qualified for the Frisco Bowl but lost the conference championship game to UTSA. Defensive coordinator Phil Bennett took over as interim head coach for the bowl game.

=== Oklahoma ===
On March 20, 2023, it was announced that Littrell would join the coaching staff at Oklahoma, his alma mater, as an offensive analyst.

On November 29, 2023, Littrell was promoted to offensive coordinator and quarterbacks coach at Oklahoma, replacing Jeff Lebby after his departure to become the head coach at the Mississippi State University.

On October 20, 2024, the University of Oklahoma announced that it was parting ways with Littrell mid-season after posting the statistically worst Oklahoma offense since 1961 through 7 games.

== Head coaching record ==
| Year | Team | Overall | Conference | Standing | Bowl/playoffs |
|---|---|---|---|---|---|
North Texas Mean Green (Conference USA) (2016–2022)
| 2016 | North Texas | 5–8 | 3–5 | 4th (West) | L Heart of Dallas |
| 2017 | North Texas | 9–5 | 7–1 | 1st (West) | L New Orleans |
| 2018 | North Texas | 9–4 | 5–3 | T–2nd (West) | L New Mexico |
| 2019 | North Texas | 4–8 | 3–5 | T–4th (West) | |
| 2020 | North Texas | 4–6 | 3–4 | 4th (West) | L Myrtle Beach |
| 2021 | North Texas | 6–7 | 5–3 | 3rd (West) | L Frisco Football Classic |
| 2022 | North Texas | 7–6 | 6–2 | T–2nd | Frisco (Note: North Texas fired Littrell before the bowl game.) |
| North Texas: | | 44–44 | 32–23 | | |
| Total: | | 44–44 | | | |
National championship Conference title Conference division title or championship game berth
