= Life Vest Inside =

U.S. nonprofit organization

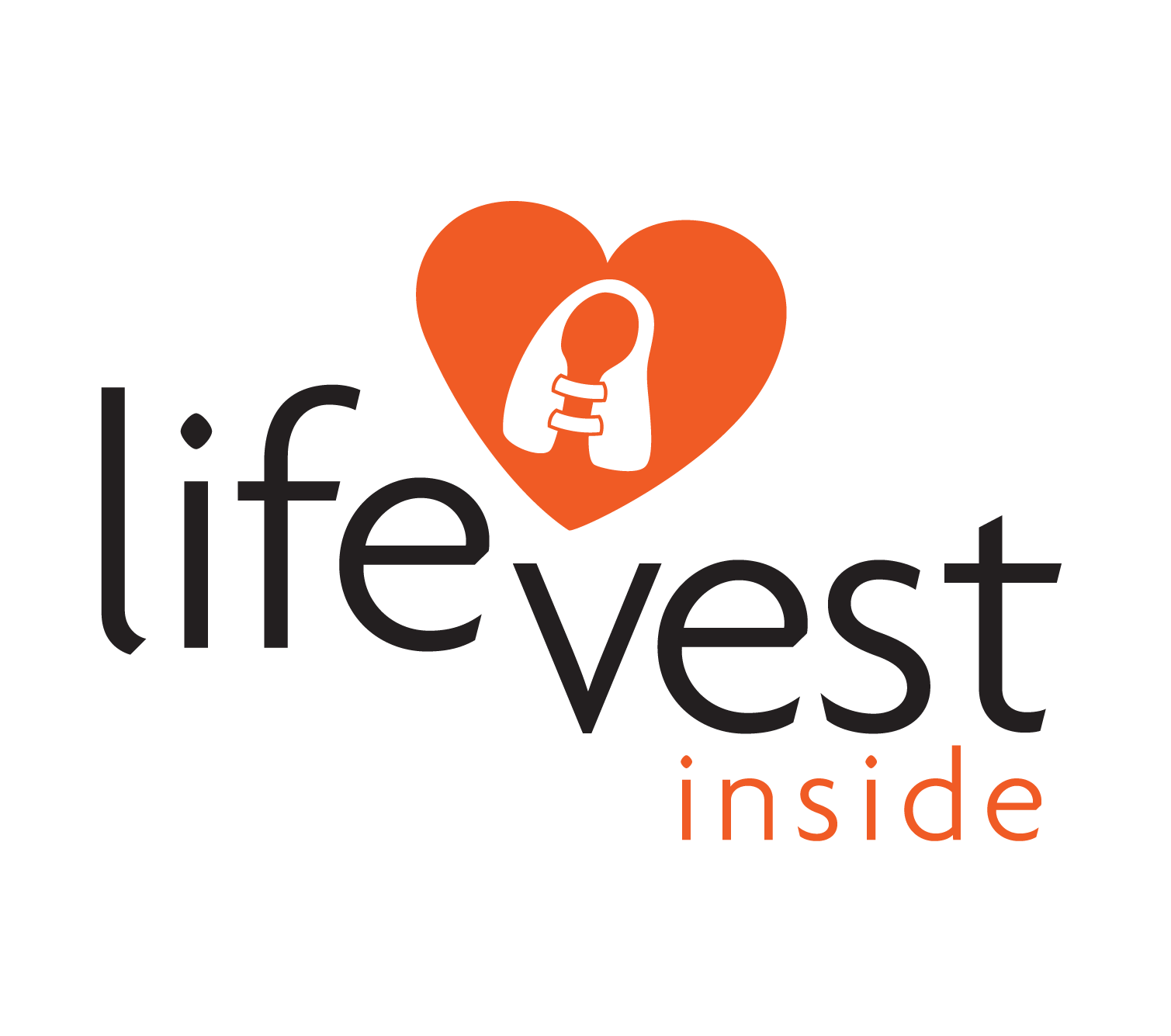
- Founded: 2011
- Founder: Orly Wahba
- Type: Non-profit organization
- Location: New York City, United States
- Region served: Worldwide
- Website: www.lifevestinside.com

Life Vest Inside (LVI) is a 501(c)(3) non-profit grassroots organization based in New York City.

== Activities ==
LVI has been featured on The Today Show, NBC, CBS, and other media outlets.

=== Film and media ===
In October 2011, Life Vest Inside posted a video called Kindness Boomerang. Shot all in one take, it shows a chain reaction of random kindness, as strangers are helped—and then help others—through a bustling cityscape. Kindness Boomerang was shot on September 1, 2010.

Revolution of Love: A video in which a struggling musician utilizes his talents to help a homeless man find hope in a time of despair. Released November 13, 2015.

=== Dance for Kindness ===
In 2012, Life Vest Inside initiated Dance For Kindness, a WorldWide event in celebration of World Kindness Day. Groups from across the globe join to perform a Kindness Freezmob/Flashmob to the same song, same dance, all happening on the same day.

The Dance for Kindness flagship location is Times Square.

In 2015, several Celebrity Ambassadors joined Life Vest Inside including:

- The Today Show's Hoda Kotb
- Peter Scolari
- Rachel Marie Thomas

Dance for Kindness Stats:

- 2012: 15 Countries, 30 cities, 3,500 participants
- 2013: 25 countries, 30 cities, 5,000 participants
- 2014: 30 countries, 80 cities, 10,000 participants
- 2015: 50 countries, 100 cities, 12,000+ participants
