= Ben Holden =

American sportscaster (born 1970)

Ben Holden (born November 3, 1970, in Lansing, Michigan) is a sportscaster most recently with CBS Sports Network and has been with the Big Ten Network.

== Biography ==
Holden called college football, basketball, and ice hockey for the CBS Sports Network and done similar roles for the Big Ten Network and Comcast SportsNet and was the voice of the Lake Erie Monsters. He has even called football and hockey games for ESPNU and CBS College Sports Network. For one season, Holden called games for the Indianapolis Indians. He also called the 2008 Stanley Cup Finals for NHL International as well and served as sports anchor/reporter for WILX-TV. He won two Emmy Awards; one in 2007 and one in 2008. He also has called college field hockey, softball, lacrosse, and soccer games for ESPN Plus. He also has called Arena football, MISL soccer, women's college basketball, volleyball, and wrestling.

Holden left CBSSN in 2021.

In March 2026, Holden was announced as the play-by-play announcer for Major League Rugby's new Sunday Night Rugby program, having served in the same role for several matches during the 2025 MLR season, including the championship match.
