= KKOY-FM =

- Chanute, Kansas; United States
- Broadcast area: Chanute, Kansas-Pittsburg, Kansas
- Frequency: 105.5 MHz
- Branding: The Dawg 105.5

Programming
- Format: Classic Rock
- Affiliations: ABC Radio

Ownership
- Owner: MyTown Media, LLC.
- Sister stations: KINZ, KKOY

History
- First air date: 1971

Technical information
- Licensing authority: FCC
- Facility ID: 48291
- Class: C3
- ERP: 8,000 watts
- HAAT: 178 meters (584 ft)
- Transmitter coordinates: 37°35′59.00″N 95°39′10.00″W

Links
- Public license information: Public file; LMS
- Webcast: Listen live
- Website: www.rockofkansas.com

KKOY-FM (105.5 MHz) is a radio station broadcasting a Classic Rock format. Licensed to Chanute, Kansas, United States, the station serves the Southeast Kansas area. The station is currently owned by MyTown Media, LLC. Studios are located on North Plummer Avenue in Chanute, and its transmitter is located near Altoona.

== History ==
105.5 signed on the air in 1971 broadcasting ABC Radio Network's Today's Best Hits satellite-fed Hot AC service with the name "Y105". The station was owned by Southeast Kansas Broadcasting, Inc. at the time. In 2004, the station cut the satellite feed and provided local programming and changed monikers to "Sunny 105.5". The ownership changed to MyTown Media, LLC in September 2008. In January 2009, the station evolved towards a Rhythmic-leaning CHR format and re-branded as "Hot 105", being one of only 2 Top 40 stations heard in Southeast Kansas with a good signal (the other being Joplin, Missouri's KSYN).

In September 2009, the station started dayparting with Hot AC material played throughout the day and retaining the Rhythmic-leaning CHR format after 9 pm. This would end in March 2011, when the station returned to a more balanced CHR format throughout the day. The station is noted for having a more diverse playlist by playing "non-charting" songs that other Top 40 stations may be late on or never play.

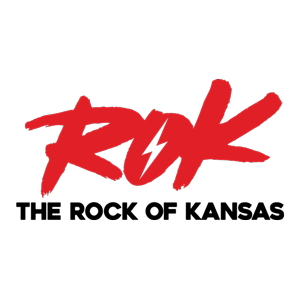
Previous logo

On March 5, 2026, the station flipped to classic rock as The Rock of Kansas, as part of a network of Murfin Media stations also including KSNP/Burlington, KIND-FM/Elk City–Independence, KSEK/Pittsburg, and KKLE/Winfield.
