= KIND-FM =

- Elk City, Kansas; United States
- Broadcast area: Independence, Kansas
- Frequency: 94.9 MHz
- Branding: The Dawg

Programming
- Format: Classic Rock

Ownership
- Owner: My Town Media, Inc

History
- First air date: 2010
- Former call signs: KBIK (2010); KBIP (2010)

Technical information
- Licensing authority: FCC
- Facility ID: 171002
- Class: A
- ERP: 6,000 watts
- HAAT: 82.9 metres (272 ft)
- Transmitter coordinates: 37°15′42″N 95°45′59″W

Links
- Public license information: Public file; LMS
- Webcast: Listen Live
- Website: rockofkansas.com

KIND-FM (94.9 MHz) is a radio station licensed to serve the community of Elk City, Kansas. The station is owned by My Town Media, Inc, and airs a classic rock format.

The station was assigned the call sign KBIK by the Federal Communications Commission on May 19, 2010. The station changed its call sign to KBIP on June 17, 2010, and then to KIND-FM on July 1, 2010.

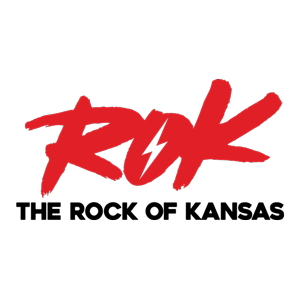
Previous logo

In March 2026, the station flipped to classic rock as The Rock of Kansas, networking with sister stations KSNP/Burlington, KKOY-FM/Chanute, KSEK/Pittsburg, and KKLE/Winfield. In August 2026, the stations dropped the "Rock of Kansas" branding due to a cease and desist from Audacy, Inc. for trademark infringement over the "Rock of Kansas" slogan (which it owns in connection to KQRC-FM), quietly rebranding to The Dawg.
