= KKOY (AM) =

- Chanute, Kansas; United States
- Broadcast area: Pittsburg, Kansas
- Frequency: 1460 kHz
- Branding: Thunder Country 1460 AM/99.9 FM

Programming
- Format: Country

Ownership
- Owner: Southeast Kansas Broadcasting Company, Inc.; (My Town Media, Inc.)
- Sister stations: KINZ, KKOY-FM

Technical information
- Licensing authority: FCC
- Facility ID: 48292
- Class: D
- Power: 1,000 watts day 57 watts night
- Transmitter coordinates: 37°41′18.2″N 95°28′12.9″W
- Translator: 99.9 K260DF (Chanute)

Links
- Public license information: Public file; LMS
- Website: kkoy.com

KKOY (1460 kHz) is an AM radio station broadcasting a country music format. Licensed to Chanute, Kansas, United States, it serves the Pittsburg area. The station is owned by My Town Media Inc.
