= KINZ =

- Humboldt, Kansas; United States
- Broadcast area: Chanute, Kansas, Southeast Kansas
- Frequency: 95.3 MHz
- Branding: 95.3 Bob FM

Programming
- Format: Adult hits
- Affiliations: Westwood One

Ownership
- Owner: My Town Media

History
- First air date: 1998; 28 years ago
- Former frequencies: 94.3 MHz (1998–2003)

Technical information
- Licensing authority: FCC
- Facility ID: 87299
- Class: C3
- ERP: 24,000 watts
- HAAT: 102 meters
- Transmitter coordinates: 37°44′52.00″N 95°33′39.00″W

Links
- Public license information: Public file; LMS
- Webcast: Listen live
- Website: KINZ Online

KINZ (95.3 FM) is a radio station broadcasting a classic hits & classic rock format. Licensed to Humboldt, Kansas, United States, it serves the Chanute area. The station is currently owned by My Town Media. Studios are located on North Plummer Avenue in Chanute, while its transmitter is located northwest of Chanute.

KINZ is an affiliate of the syndicated Pink Floyd program "Floydian Slip".

On November 3, 2023 KINZ changed its format from classic hits to adult hits, branded as "95.3 Bob FM".
