= FIU Panthers football statistical leaders =

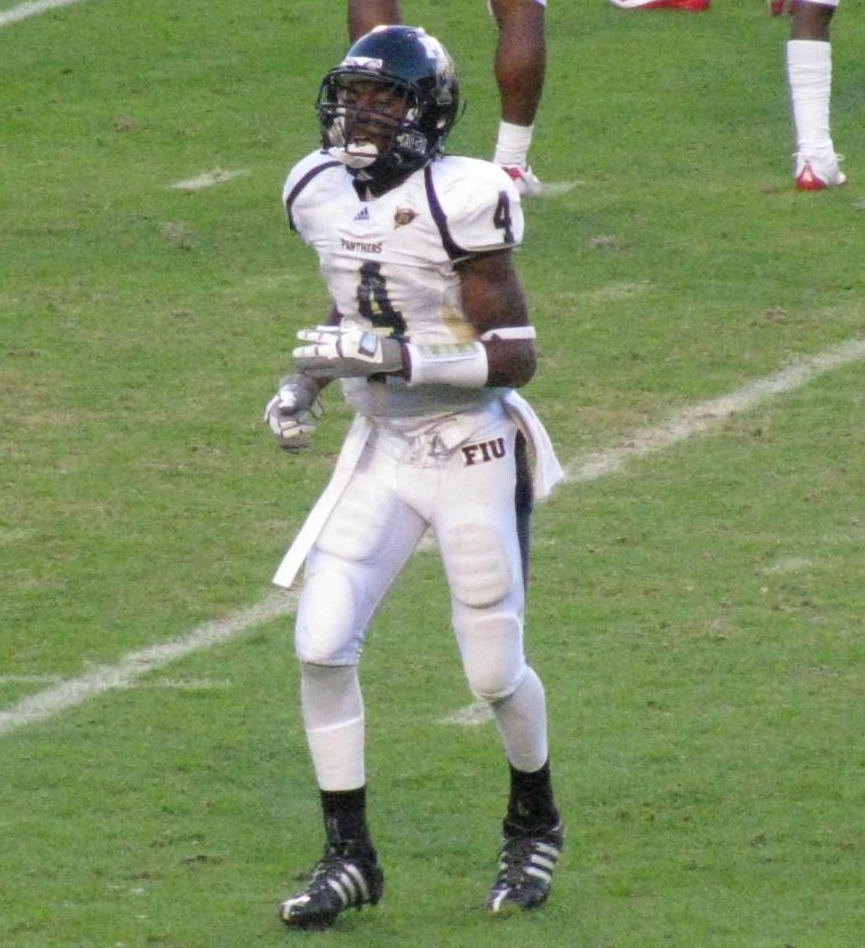
Receiver T.Y. Hilton, retired after a career with the Indianapolis Colts, is FIU's career leader in receiving yards, receiving touchdowns, and receptions.

The FIU Panthers football statistical leaders are individual statistical leaders of the FIU Panthers football program in various categories, including passing, rushing, receiving, total offense, defensive stats, and kicking. Within those areas, the lists identify single-game, single-season, and career leaders. The Panthers represent Florida International University in the NCAA's Conference USA.

FIU began competing in intercollegiate football in 2002, so the typical issues with school records do not exist. There is no period of the late 19th and early 20th century with spotty, incomplete records. Therefore, Panthers' records are also not affected by the lengthening of the season to 12 games over the years, the 1972 NCAA decision to allow freshmen to play varsity football, or the 2002 NCAA decision to count bowl games in players' official statistics.

These lists are updated through the end of the 2025 season.

== Passing ==
=== Passing yards ===
Career
Rank	Player	Yards	Years
1	Josh Padrick	9,237	2003 2004 2005 2006
2	Alex McGough	9,091	2014 2015 2016 2017
3	Keyone Jenkins	6,721	2023 2024 2025
4	James Morgan	5,287	2018 2019
5	Paul McCall	5,189	2006 2007 2008 2009
6	Wesley Carroll	4,997	2010 2011
7	Jake Medlock	3,425	2011 2012 2013
8	Max Bortenschlager	3,219	2020 2021
9	Grayson James	2,342	2021 2022 2023
10	Wayne Younger	1,938	2007 2008 2009 2010

Single season
Rank	Player	Yards	Year
1	Max Bortenschlager	2,935	2021
2	Alex McGough	2,798	2017
3	James Morgan	2,727	2018
4	Alex McGough	2,722	2015
5	Wesley Carroll	2,623	2010
6	James Morgan	2,560	2019
7	Keyone Jenkins	2,557	2024
8	Josh Padrick	2,493	2003
9	Josh Padrick	2,461	2005
10	Keyone Jenkins	2,422	2023

Single game
Rank	Player	Yards	Year	Opponent
1	Max Bortenschlager	466	2021	Charlotte
2	Haden Carlson	414	2022	Middle Tennessee
3	Paul McCall	400	2008	Florida Atlantic
4	Max Bortenschlager	395	2021	Central Michigan
5	James Morgan	394	2019	Louisiana Tech
6	Alex McGough	390	2015	Old Dominion
7	Jake Medlock	380	2012	Middle Tennessee
8	Josh Padrick	370	2003	Georgia Southern
9	J. J. Kohl	367	2026	Buffalo
10	Keyone Jenkins	362	2024	Monmouth

=== Passing touchdowns ===
Career
Rank	Player	TDs	Years
1	Alex McGough	65	2014 2015 2016 2017
2	Josh Padrick	42	2003 2004 2005 2006
	Keyone Jenkins	42	2023 2024 2025
4	James Morgan	40	2018 2019
5	Paul McCall	34	2006 2007 2008 2009
6	Wesley Carroll	30	2010 2011
7	Max Bortenschlager	21	2020 2021
8	Jake Medlock	18	2011 2012 2013
9	Jamie Burke	14	2002 2003 2004 2005
10	Grayson James	13	2021 2022 2023

Single season
Rank	Player	TDs	Year
1	James Morgan	26	2018
2	Keyone Jenkins	22	2024
3	Alex McGough	21	2015
4	Max Bortenschlager	19	2021
5	Alex McGough	17	2017
6	Wesley Carroll	16	2010
7	Paul McCall	15	2008
8	Jamie Burke	14	2002
	Paul McCall	14	2009
	Wesley Carroll	14	2011
	Alex McGough	14	2014
	James Morgan	14	2019

Single game
Rank	Player	TDs	Year	Opponent
1	Jamie Burke	4	2002	Albany
	Paul McCall	4	2008	North Texas
	Paul McCall	4	2008	Florida Atlantic
	Max Bortenschlager	4	2021	Charlotte
	Grayson James	4	2022	Bryant
	Haden Carlson	4	2022	Middle Tennessee
	Keyone Jenkins	4	2024	New Mexico State
	Joe Pesansky	4	2025	Middle Tennessee

== Rushing ==
=== Rushing yards ===
Career
Rank	Player	Yards	Years
1	Alex Gardner	3,037	2014 2015 2016 2017
2	Kejon Owens	2,262	2021 2022 2023 2024 2025
3	D'Vonte Price	2,221	2017 2018 2019 2020 2021
4	Rashod Smith	2,195	2002 2003 2004
5	Kedrick Rhodes	2,156	2010 2011 2012
6	Napoleon Maxwell	2,090	2014 2017 2018 2019
7	Anthony Jones	2,010	2015 2016 2018 2019
8	Darriet Perry	1,809	2008 2009 2010 2011
9	A'mod Ned	1,666	2005 2006 2007 2008
10	Julian Reams	1,402	2005 2006 2007 2008

Single season
Rank	Player	Yards	Year
1	Kejon Owens	1,334	2025
2	Kedrick Rhodes	1,149	2011
3	Rashod Smith	1,133	2004
4	Alex Gardner	930	2016
5	Anthony Jones	867	2019
6	Darriet Perry	839	2010
7	Rashod Smith	784	2002
8	Alex Gardner	765	2017
9	Alex Gardner	760	2015
10	Adam Gorman	736	2003

Single game
Rank	Player	Yards	Year	Opponent
1	Rashod Smith	262	2002	Jacksonville
2	Rashod Smith	230	2004	New Mexico State
3	Devonte Lyons	215	2026	Missouri State
4	Ben West	214	2005	Florida A&M
5	Rashod Smith	199	2004	Stephen F. Austin
6	Kejon Owens	195	2025	Western Kentucky
7	Adam Gorman	187	2003	Holy Cross
	Kaylan Wiggins	187	2019	UNH
9	Darriet Perry	186	2010	Troy
10	D'Vonte Price	178	2020	Florida Atlantic

=== Rushing touchdowns ===
Career
Rank	Player	TDs	Years
1	Darriet Perry	27	2008 2009 2010 2011
2	Rashod Smith	24	2002 2003 2004
3	Alex Gardner	22	2014 2015 2016 2017
	Napoleon Maxwell	22	2014 2017 2018 2019
	Kejon Owens	22	2021 2022 2023 2024 2025
6	Anthony Jones	21	2015 2016 2018 2019
7	D'Vonte Price	15	2017 2018 2019 2020 2021
8	Darian Mallary	13	2009 2010 2011 2012
	Kedrick Rhodes	13	2010 2011 2012
	Keyone Jenkins	13	2023 2024 2025

Single season
Rank	Player	TDs	Year
1	Darriet Perry	16	2010
2	Rashod Smith	12	2004
3	Kejon Owens	11	2025
4	Rashod Smith	9	2002
	Darian Mallary	9	2012
	Alex Gardner	9	2015
	Anthony Jones	9	2019
	Napoleon Maxwell	9	2019
9	Adam Gorman	8	2003
	Kedrick Rhodes	8	2011

Single game
Rank	Player	TDs	Year	Opponent
1	Rashod Smith	4	2004	New Mexico State
2	Rashod Smith	3	2002	Butler
	Adam Gorman	3	2003	Holy Cross
	Rashod Smith	3	2004	Stephen F. Austin
	Ben West	3	2005	Florida Atlantic
	Julian Reams	3	2008	Toledo
	Kendall Berry	3	2009	Middle Tennessee
	Darriet Perry	3	2010	Louisiana-Lafayette
	Kedrick Rhodes	3	2011	Louisiana-Lafayette
	D'Vonte Price	3	2021	Long Island University
	Kejon Owens	3	2023	North Texas

== Receiving ==
=== Receptions ===
Career
Rank	Player	Rec	Years
1	T.Y. Hilton	229	2008 2009 2010 2011
2	Chandler Williams	203	2003 2004 2005 2006
3	Cory McKinney	185	2002 2003 2004 2005
4	Jonnu Smith	178	2013 2014 2015 2016
5	Wayne Times	167	2009 2010 2011 2012
6	Thomas Owens	157	2015 2016 2017
7	Samuel Smith	133	2003 2004 2005 2006
8	Greg Ellingson	131	2007 2008 2009 2010
9	Tony Gaiter IV	120	2016 2017 2018 2019
10	Alex Gardner	115	2014 2015 2016 2017

Single season
Rank	Player	Rec	Year
1	T.Y. Hilton	72	2011
2	Chandler Williams	67	2006
3	Wayne Times	66	2012
4	Kris Mitchell	64	2023
5	Eric Rivers	62	2024
6	Chandler Williams	61	2005
	Jonnu Smith	61	2014
8	Alex Gardner	60	2015
9	T.Y. Hilton	59	2010
	Thomas Owens	59	2017

Single game
Rank	Player	Rec	Year	Opponent
1	T.Y. Hilton	12	2011	Akron
2	Samuel Smith	11	2006	Middle Tennessee
	Chandler Williams	11	2006	Troy
	T.Y. Hilton	11	2009	Louisiana-Monroe
	T.Y. Hilton	11	2010	Arkansas State
	Wayne Times	11	2012	Louisiana-Monroe
	Thomas Owens	11	2016	Charlotte
	Eric Rivers	11	2024	New Mexico State
9	Samuel Smith	10	2004	Youngstown State
	Cory McKinney	10	2004	Louisiana-Lafayette
	Cory McKinney	10	2004	Georgia Southern
	Chandler Williams	10	2004	Georgia Southern
	Chandler Williams	10	2006	South Florida
	Thomas Owens	10	2015	UCF
	Alex Gardner	10	2015	Massachusetts
	Thomas Owens	10	2015	Middle Tennessee
	Jonnu Smith	10	2015	Old Dominion
	Alex Gardner	10	2015	Western Kentucky
	Tyrese Chambers	10	2022	Texas State
	Tyrese Chambers	10	2022	Charlotte

=== Receiving yards ===
Career
Rank	Player	Yards	Years
1	T.Y. Hilton	3,531	2008 2009 2010 2011
2	Cory McKinney	2,745	2002 2003 2004 2005
3	Chandler Williams	2,519	2003 2004 2005 2006
4	Thomas Owens	2,177	2015 2016 2017
5	Greg Ellingson	2,018	2007 2008 2009 2010
6	Jonnu Smith	2,001	2013 2014 2015 2016
7	Harold Leath	1,760	2002 2003 2004
8	Austin Maloney	1,738	2016 2017 2018 2019
9	Wayne Times	1,717	2009 2010 2011 2012
10	Kris Mitchell	1,663	2020 2021 2022 2023

Single season
Rank	Player	Yards	Year
1	Eric Rivers	1,172	2024
2	Kris Mitchell	1,118	2023
3	Tyrese Chambers	1,074	2021
4	T.Y. Hilton	1,038	2011
5	T.Y. Hilton	1,013	2008
6	Cory McKinney	890	2002
7	Thomas Owens	887	2017
8	Chandler Williams	870	2005
9	T.Y. Hilton	848	2010
10	Bryce Singleton	847	2021

Single game
Rank	Player	Yards	Year	Opponent
1	Eric Rivers	295	2024	New Mexico State
2	T.Y. Hilton	201	2011	Louisville
	Tyrese Chambers	201	2021	Charlotte
	Kris Mitchell	201	2023	Maine
5	T.Y. Hilton	199	2008	Arkansas State
	Bryce Singleton	199	2021	Old Dominion
7	Harold Leath	192	2003	Georgia Southern
8	Jonnu Smith	183	2015	Old Dominion
9	Austin Maloney	178	2019	Arkansas State (Camellia Bowl)
10	Tyrese Chambers	175	2021	Central Michigan

=== Receiving touchdowns ===
Career
Rank	Player	TDs	Years
1	T.Y. Hilton	24	2008 2009 2010 2011
2	Cory McKinney	22	2002 2003 2004 2005
3	Thomas Owens	21	2015 2016 2017
4	Jonnu Smith	18	2013 2014 2015 2016
5	Greg Ellingson	14	2007 2008 2009 2010
	Eric Rivers	14	2023 2024
7	Tyrese Chambers	13	2021 2022
8	Harold Leath	12	2002 2003 2004
9	Kris Mitchell	11	2020 2021 2022 2023
10	Austin Maloney	9	2016 2017 2018 2019
	Bryce Singleton	9	2017 2018 2020 2021
	Shemar Thorton	9	2017 2018 2020 2021
	Alex Perry	9	2025

Single season
Rank	Player	TDs	Year
1	Eric Rivers	12	2024
2	Tyrese Chambers	9	2021
	Alex Perry	9	2025
4	Jonnu Smith	8	2014
	Thomas Owens	8	2015
6	Cory McKinney	7	2002
	T.Y. Hilton	7	2008
	T.Y. Hilton	7	2011
	Thomas Owens	7	2016
	Kris Mitchell	7	2023
	Dean Patterson	7	2024

Single game
Rank	Player	TDs	Year	Opponent
1	Jonnu Smith	3	2014	Middle Tennessee
	Rivaldo Fairweather	3	2022	Middle Tennessee
	Eric Rivers	3	2024	New Mexico State

== Total offense ==
Total offense is the sum of passing and rushing statistics. It does not include receiving or returns.

=== Total offense yards ===
Career
Rank	Player	Yards	Years
1	Alex McGough	9,626	2014 2015 2016 2017
2	Josh Padrick	8,971	2003 2004 2005 2006
3	Keyone Jenkins	7,033	2023 2024 2025
4	Paul McCall	5,333	2006 2007 2008 2009
5	James Morgan	5,207	2018 2019
6	Wesley Carroll	4,979	2010 2011
7	Jake Medlock	3,767	2011 2012 2013
8	Max Bortenschlager	2,944	2020 2021
9	Wayne Younger	2,626	2007 2008 2009 2010
10	Grayson James	2,603	2021 2022 2023

Single season
Rank	Player	Yards	Year
1	Alex McGough	3,029	2017
2	Alex McGough	2,817	2015
3	James Morgan	2,687	2018
	Keyone Jenkins	2,687	2024
5	Max Bortenschlager	2,685	2021
6	Wesley Carroll	2,615	2010
7	James Morgan	2,520	2019
8	Josh Padrick	2,473	2005
9	Keyone Jenkins	2,472	2023
10	Paul McCall	2,458	2008

Single game
Rank	Player	Yards	Year	Opponent
1	Haden Carlson	435	2022	Middle Tennessee
2	Max Bortenschlager	430	2021	Charlotte
3	Paul McCall	401	2008	Florida Atlantic
	James Morgan	401	2019	Louisiana Tech
5	Wesley Carroll	387	2010	Maryland
6	J. J. Kohl	386	2026	Buffalo
7	Keyone Jenkins	382	2024	Monmouth
8	Josh Padrick	381	2003	Georgia Southern
	Jake Medlock	381	2012	Middle Tennessee
10	Alex McGough	380	2015	Old Dominion

=== Touchdowns responsible for ===
"Touchdowns responsible for" is the NCAA's official term for combined passing and rushing touchdowns.

Career
Rank	Player	TDs	Years
1	Alex McGough	81	2014 2015 2016 2017
2	Keyone Jenkins	55	2023 2024 2025
3	Josh Padrick	47	2003 2004 2005 2006
4	James Morgan	43	2018 2019
5	Paul McCall	37	2006 2007 2008 2009
6	Wesley Carroll	31	2010 2011
7	Darriet Perry	27	2008 2009 2010 2011
8	Rashod Smith	24	2002 2003 2004
9	Jake Medlock	23	2011 2012 2013
10	Max Bortenschlager	22	2020 2021
	Kejon Owens	22	2021 2022 2023 2024 2025

Single season
Rank	Player	TDs	Year
1	James Morgan	27	2018
2	Alex McGough	24	2015
	Keyone Jenkins	24	2024
4	Alex McGough	22	2017
5	Max Bortenschlager	20	2021
6	Alex McGough	18	2014
7	Josh Padrick	17	2005
	Wesley Carroll	17	2010
	Alex McGough	17	2016
	Keyone Jenkins	17	2023

== Defense ==
=== Interceptions ===
Career
Rank	Player	Ints	Years
1	Nick Turnbull	16	2002 2003 2004 2005
2	Anthony Gaitor	11	2007 2008 2009 2010
3	Richard Leonard	9	2011 2012 2014 2015
4	Lionell Singleton	8	2004 2005 2006 2007
	Rishard Dames	8	2018 2019 2020 2021
6	Johnathan Cyprien	7	2009 2010 2011 2012
	Justin Halley	7	2011 2012 2013 2014
8	Dorian Hall	6	2017 2018 2019 2020 2021 2022
9	Jeremiah Weatherspoon	5	2005 2006 2008 2009
	Chuck Grace	5	2008 2009 2010 2011
	Sam Miller	5	2010 2011 2012 2013
	Jeremiah McKinnon	5	2012 2013 2014 2015
	CJ Christian	5	2022 2023 2024

Single season
Rank	Player	Ints	Year
1	Nick Turnbull	5	2002
	Nick Turnbull	5	2004
	Lionell Singleton	5	2006
	Anthony Gaitor	5	2008
	Richard Leonard	5	2014
6	Nick Turnbull	4	2003
	Justin Halley	4	2011
	Johnathan Cyprien	4	2012
	Rishard Dames	4	2018
	Jessiah McGrew	4	2025

Single game
Rank	Player	Ints	Year	Opponent
1	Nick Turnbull	2	2002	Bethune-Cookman
	Nick Turnbull	2	2003	Gardner-Webb
	Nick Turnbull	2	2004	McNeese State
	Lionell Singleton	2	2006	Bowling Green
	Anthony Gaitor	2	2008	Middle Tennessee
	Kreg Brown	2	2010	Toledo
	Justin Halley	2	2011	Florida Atlantic
	Justin Halley	2	2013	Louisiana Tech
	Richard Leonard	2	2014	UAB
	Jessiah McGrew	2	2025	Western Kentucky

=== Tackles ===
Career
Rank	Player	Tackles	Years
1	Johnathan Cyprien	365	2009 2010 2011 2012
2	Sage Lewis	307	2016 2017 2018 2019
3	Scott Bryant	302	2006 2007 2008 2009
4	Keyonvis Bouie	299	2003 2004 2005 2006
5	John Haritan	295	2002 2003 2004
6	Winston Fraser	287	2009 2010 2011 2012
7	Richard Dames	269	2017 2018 2019 2020 2021
8	Nick Turnbull	267	2002 2003 2004 2005
9	Lance Preston	263	2002 2003 2004 2005
10	Alexander Bostic III	257	2003 2004 2005 2006

Single season
Rank	Player	Tackles	Year
1	Sage Lewis	132	2018
2	Travion Barnes	129	2024
3	Donovan Manuel	121	2023
4	Keyonvis Bouie	119	2006
5	Keyonvis Bouie	118	2005
6	John Haritan	117	2003
7	Johnathan Cyprien	113	2010
8	Treyvon Williams	109	2016
9	Winston Fraser	108	2011
	Anthony Wint	108	2016

Single game
Rank	Player	Tackles	Year	Opponent
1	John Haritan	21	2004	Youngstown State
2	Keyonvis Bouie	20	2006	Alabama
3	Keyonvis Bouie	19	2006	Louisiana-Monroe
	Michael Dominguez	19	2007	Louisiana-Lafayette
	JoJo Evans	19	2024	UTEP
6	Keyonvis Bouie	18	2006	Troy
	Keyonvis Bouie	18	2006	Louisiana-Lafayette
	Keyonvis Bouie	18	2006	Middle Tennessee
	Sage Lewis	18	2018	Indiana
10	Winston Fraser	17	2011	Arkansas State
	Sage Lewis	17	2019	Marshall

=== Sacks ===
Career
Rank	Player	Sacks	Years
1	Antwan Barnes	21.5	2003 2004 2005 2006
2	Tourek Williams	18.0	2009 2010 2011 2012
	Mike Wakefield	17.5	2012 2013 2014 2015
4	Greg Hickman	13.0	2010 2011 2012 2013
5	Daunte Foster	12.5	2002 2003 2004
	Denzell Perine	12.5	2012 2013 2014 2015
7	Toronto Smith	11.5	2007 2008 2009 2010
8	Jarvis Wilson	10.0	2007 2008 2009 2010
	Keegan Davis	10.0	2022 2023 2024 2025
10	Brandon Higdon	8.0	2002 2003 2004 2005
	Winston Fraser	8.0	2009 2010 2011 2012

Single season
Rank	Player	Sacks	Year
1	Antwan Barnes	9.5	2005
	Jarvis Wilson	9.5	2010
3	Mike Wakefield	8.0	2014
4	Alexander Bostic III	7.5	2006
	Mike Wakefield	7.5	2015
6	DeeJay Holmes Jr.	7.0	2026
7	Tourek Williams	6.5	2012
	Denzell Perine	6.5	2014
9	Antwan Barnes	6.0	2006
	Tourek Williams	6.0	2010
	Shaun Peterson Jr.	6.0	2022
	Kenton Simmons	6.0	2025

Single game
Rank	Player	Sacks	Year	Opponent
1	Antwan Barnes	4.0	2006	Middle Tennessee
	Audric Adger	4.0	2007	North Texas
	Mike Wakefield	4.0	2015	Charlotte
4	Antwan Barnes	3.0	2006	Arkansas State
	Jarvis Wilson	3.0	2010	Louisiana-Lafayette
	Shaun Peterson Jr.	3.0	2022	Charlotte
7	Antwan Barnes	2.5	2005	Arkansas State
	Toronto Smith	2.5	2008	Arkansas State
	Denzell Perine	2.5	2014	Bethune-Cookman

== Kicking ==
=== Field goals made ===
Career
Rank	Player	FGs	Years
1	José Borregales	50	2017 2018 2019
2	Jack Griffin	48	2009 2010 2011 2012
3	Austin Taylor	45	2013 2014 2015 2016
4	Adam Moss	41	2002 2003 2004 2005
5	Dustin Rivest	29	2006 2007 2008 2009
6	Chase Gabriel	28	2020 2021 2022 2023 2024
7	Noah Grant	14	2025
8	Chris Abed	5	2007
	Alejandro Prado	5	2024

Single season
Rank	Player	FGs	Year
1	Jack Griffin	22	2011
2	José Berregales	21	2019
3	Jack Griffin	17	2010
4	Austin Taylor	15	2014
	Jose Berregales	15	2017
6	Adam Moss	14	2003
	Jose Berregales	14	2018
	Noah Grant	14	2025
9	Adam Moss	13	2004
10	Dustin Rivest	12	2008
	Austin Taylor	12	2016

Single game
Rank	Player	FGs	Year	Opponent
1	Dustin Rivest	5	2008	Arkansas State
	Robert Czeremcha	5	2026	New Mexico State
3	Adam Moss	4	2003	Gardner-Webb
	Noah Grant	4	2025	Western Kentucky

=== Field goal percentage ===
Career
Rank	Player	FG%	Years
1	Noah Grant	77.8%	2025
2	Jack Griffin	77.4%	2009 2010 2011 2012
3	Jose Berregales	75.8%	2017 2018 2019
4	Austin Taylor	71.4%	2013 2014 2015 2016
5	Chase Gabriel	66.7%	2020 2021 2022 2023 2024
6	Adam Moss	64.1%	2002 2003 2004 2005
7	Chris Abed	62.5%	2007
8	Dustin Rivest	61.7%	2006 2007 2008 2009

Single season
Rank	Player	FG%	Year
1	Jack Griffin	85.0%	2010
2	Jack Griffin	84.6%	2011
3	Jose Berregales	83.3%	2017
4	Adam Moss	78.6%	2005
5	Noah Grant	77.8%	2025
6	Austin Taylor	75.0%	2016
	Chase Gabriel	75.0%	2023
8	Jose Berregales	73.7%	2018
9	Jose Berregales	72.4%	2019
10	Dustin Rivest	71.4%	2009
	Austin Taylor	71.4%	2014
	Austin Taylor	71.4%	2015
