= List of FIU Panthers football seasons =

The FIU Panthers represent Florida International University (FIU) in Miami, Florida. The Panthers are an NCAA FBS college football team in Conference USA led by Willie Simmons and play at the on-campus FIU Stadium.

This is a list of their annual results.

== Seasons ==
Year	Coach	Overall	Conference	Standing	Bowl/playoffs	Coaches^{#}	AP^{°}
Independent (2002–2004)
2002	Don Strock	5–6					
2003	Don Strock	0–10††					
2004	Don Strock	0–7††					
Sun Belt Conference (2005–2012)
2005	Don Strock	0–6††	0–4††	T–2nd			
2006	Don Strock	0–12	0–7	5th			
2007	Mario Cristobal	1–11	1–6	7th			
2008	Mario Cristobal	5–7	3–4	T–5th			
2009	Mario Cristobal	3–9	3–5	6th			
2010	Mario Cristobal	7–6	6–2	T–1st	W Little Caesars Pizza		
2011	Mario Cristobal	8–5	5–3	4th	L Beef 'O' Brady's		
2012	Mario Cristobal	3–9	2–6	T–8th			
Conference USA (2013–present)
2013	Ron Turner	1–11	1–7	7th (East)			
2014	Ron Turner	4–8	3–5	6th (East)			
2015	Ron Turner	5–7	3–5	T–4th (East)			
2016	Ron Turner/Ron Cooper	4–8	4–4	4th (East)			
2017	Butch Davis	8–5	5–3	2nd (East)	L Gasparilla		
2018	Butch Davis	9–4	6–2	T–2nd (East)	W Bahamas		
2019	Butch Davis	6–7	3–5	T–5th (East)	L Camellia		
2020	Butch Davis	0–5	0–3	6th (East)			
2021	Butch Davis	1–11	0–8	7th (East)			
2022	Mike MacIntyre	4–8	2–6	T–9th			
2023	Mike MacIntyre	4–8	1–7	9th			
2024	Mike MacIntyre	4–8	3–5	T–6th			
2025	Willie Simmons	7–6	5–3	T–4th	L First Responder		
Total:		85–176					
National championship Conference title Conference division title or championship game berth
^{†}Indicates Bowl Coalition, Bowl Alliance, BCS, or CFP / New Years' Six bowl.; ^{#}Rankings from final Coaches Poll.

†† 2003 season (2 wins), 2004 season (3 wins), and 2005 (5 overall wins, 3 conference wins) season wins vacated due to NCAA sanctions.
