= List of FIU Panthers in the NFL draft =

This is a list of FIU Panthers football players in the NFL draft.

== Key ==
B	Back	K	Kicker	NT	Nose tackle
C	Center	LB	Linebacker	FB	Fullback
DB	Defensive back	P	Punter	HB	Halfback
DE	Defensive end	QB	Quarterback	WR	Wide receiver
DT	Defensive tackle	RB	Running back	G	Guard
E	End	T	Offensive tackle	TE	Tight end

== Selections ==
Year	Round	Pick	Player	Team	Position	Notes
2007	4	134	Antwan Barnes	Baltimore Ravens	LB	
2007	7	223	Chandler Williams	Minnesota Vikings	WR	
2011	7	222	Anthony Gaitor	Tampa Bay Buccaneers	DB	
2012	3	92	T. Y. Hilton	Indianapolis Colts	WR	
2013	2	33	Johnathan Cyprien	Jacksonville Jaguars	DB	
2013	6	179	Tourek Williams	San Diego Chargers	DE	
2017	3	100	Jonnu Smith	Tennessee Titans	TE	
2018	7	220	Alex McGough	Seattle Seahawks	QB	
2020	4	125	James Morgan	New York Jets	QB	
2020	7	221	Stantley Thomas-Oliver	Carolina Panthers	DB	
