= Michael Henig =

American football player (born 1985)

No. 7
- Position: Quarterback

Personal information
- Born: December 7, 1985 (age 40); Montgomery, Alabama, U.S.
- Listed height: 6 ft 0 in (1.83 m)
- Listed weight: 185 lb (84 kg)

Career information
- High school: Jefferson Davis (Montgomery, Alabama)
- College: Mississippi State Bulldogs (2004–2007)

Michael David Henig Jr. (born December 7, 1985) is an American former college football quarterback who played for the Mississippi State Bulldogs. Henig served as backup to Omarr Conner earlier in his career before assuming the starting role late in 2005. His 2006 season was marked by injuries, but he was the starting quarterback for 2007.

== Early life ==
Michael Henig prepped at Jefferson Davis High School in Montgomery, Alabama. He started his senior year and led the team to an 8–3 season, passing for 1339 yards and 14 touchdowns. In the summer of 2003, he was one of just 100 quarterbacks nationwide to be selected to the EA Sports Elite 11 quarterback camp.

== College career ==
Henig played in only one game in the 2004 season at Mississippi State. Backing up Omarr Conner, he completed one pass for nine yards in Mississippi State's game against Vanderbilt. A separated shoulder prevented him from playing any more that season, and he received a medical redshirt for the year. Henig began his redshirt freshman 2005 season again as the backup to Omarr Conner. He played in 5 of the first 8 games of the season and was named the starter before the 9th game, against Alabama. Henig ended the season on a high note with a 35-14 over archrival Ole Miss.

Henig began his sophomore season in 2006 as the starting quarterback, but suffered a devastating collarbone injury in the first half of the first game against South Carolina. He missed the next 4 games entirely, and did not return until the West Virginia game when Omarr Conner received a severe injury. Henig then led the Bulldogs to a blowout victory over Jacksonville State and heartbreaking 3-point losses against Georgia and Kentucky, and then a 24-16 upset of Alabama. Henig reinjured his collarbone in the following game against Arkansas and missed the rest of the season.

Henig was named the starter for the 2007 season, though he faced competition from junior college recruit Josh Riddell and true freshman QB Wesley Carroll. Henig threw six interceptions in the season opener against LSU resulting in a 45–0 loss. In the Bulldogs 19–14 win at Auburn, Henig broke his hand in the 1st quarter, and was replaced by Wesley Carroll. and did not start another game for the Bulldogs. After the 2007 season news came out that a chronic hip injury sustained during the 2007 Mississippi State football season had terminated his Bulldog playing career.

== Statistics ==
Year	Class	Games	Starts	Att	Comp	Yards	TD	Int
2004	FR	1	0	4	1	1	0	0
2005	FR	8	3	135	60	621	2	5
2006	SO	7	6	169	74	1201	7	9
2007	JR	6	3	78	36	447	1	9
Career		22	12	386	171	2278	10	23
