= Chandler Williams =

American gridiron football player (1985–2013)

No. 18
- Position: Wide receiver

Personal information
- Born: August 9, 1985; Miami, Florida, U.S.
- Died: January 5, 2013 (aged 27); Miami, Florida, U.S.
- Listed height: 5 ft 11 in (1.80 m)
- Listed weight: 176 lb (80 kg)

Career information
- High school: Miami Senior
- College: FIU
- NFL draft: 2007: 7th round, 233rd overall pick

Career history
- Minnesota Vikings (2007)*; Miami Dolphins (2007–2008)*; Atlanta Falcons (2008–2009)*; Kansas City Chiefs (2009–2010); Toronto Argonauts (2012); Tampa Bay Storm (2012–2013)
- * Offseason or practice squad member only

Awards and highlights
- 2× Second-team All-Sun Belt (2005–2006)

Career CFL statistics
- Receptions: 4
- Receiving yards: 88
- Stats at CFL.ca (archived)

Career AFL statistics
- Receptions: 83
- Receiving yards: 996
- Receiving touchdowns: 17
- Stats at ArenaFan.com
- Stats at Pro Football Reference

Chandler Williams III (August 9, 1985 – January 5, 2013) was an American professional football wide receiver. He was selected by the Minnesota Vikings in the seventh round of the 2007 NFL draft. He played college football at Florida International.

Williams was also a member of the Miami Dolphins, Atlanta Falcons, and Kansas City Chiefs of the National Football League (NFL), the Toronto Argonauts of the Canadian Football League (CFL), and the Tampa Bay Storm of the Arena Football League (AFL).

== College career ==
Williams played four years at FIU and left as one of the most prolific receivers in school history. Williams was Florida International's career leader in receptions with 203 receptions until T. Y. Hilton caught 229 receptions in his four-year career. Williams places 3rd on FIU's career leaderboard with 2,519 career yards and 6th with 8 career touchdowns. Williams also returned punts in college.

In his senior season, he ranked ninth nationally in receptions per game and first in the Sun Belt Conference. Williams also led the conference in yards per game averaging 66.4 yards per game.

== Professional career ==
=== Minnesota Vikings ===
Williams was selected in the seventh round (233rd overall selection) of the 2007 NFL draft by the Vikings. Williams was the second player in Florida International's history to be selected in the NFL draft. (Antwan Barnes was picked in the fourth round by the Baltimore Ravens). Williams was the second of the Vikings' eight draft picks to sign a contract on May 30, 2007. He was cut by the Vikings after training camp in 2007.

=== Miami Dolphins ===
Williams was later signed to the practice squad of the Miami Dolphins, where he spent the entire season. He was re-signed in the 2008 offseason, but was waived on April 25.

=== Atlanta Falcons ===
Williams was signed by the Falcons on April 29, 2008. He was released by the Falcons during final cuts on August 30. On November 11, the Falcons re-signed him to their practice squad.

After spending the entire 2008 season on the practice squad, Williams was re-signed to a future contract on January 5, 2009. He was waived on September 4.

=== Kansas City Chiefs ===
Williams was signed to the Kansas City Chiefs' practice squad on December 23, 2009. After his contract expired following the season, he was re-signed to a future contract on January 4, 2010. He was cut by the Chiefs on May 6, 2010.

He was later re-signed and waived again on August 29, 2011.

=== Toronto Argonauts ===
On June 6, 2012, Williams signed with the Toronto Argonauts of the Canadian Football League. He was released by the Argonauts on October 4, 2012. During his stint with the Argonauts, Williams recorded 4 receptions for 88 yards, his longest reception for 55 yards.

== Personal life ==
Williams was married to Vanitia Harrigan. They had a daughter together, Tori Summer-Rose Williams.

== Death ==
Williams died on January 5, 2013, of a suspected heart related condition while participating in a flag football tournament in Miami. He was 27.

== See also ==
- List of gridiron football players who died during their careers
