= Omarr Conner =

American football player (born 1984)

No. 14
- Positions: Quarterback, wide receiver

Personal information
- Born: November 22, 1984 (age 41); Starkville, Mississippi, U.S.
- Listed height: 6 ft 0 in (1.83 m)
- Listed weight: 223 lb (101 kg)

Career information
- High school: Noxubee County High School
- College: Mississippi State (2003–2006)
- Stats at ESPN

Omarr Conner (born November 22, 1984) is an American former football quarterback who played for the Mississippi State Bulldogs in 2003, 2004, 2005, and 2006.

Conner played wide receiver in 2003 before taking over the starting quarterback job in 2004. Near the end of the 2005 season, he moved back to wide receiver when Michael Henig won the quarterback job. Conner returned to the quarterback job when Henig was hurt in 2006, leading the Bulldogs to an overtime win over UAB with a 25-yard touchdown run. Conner himself was injured in a loss to West Virginia but returned to action late in the season when Henig was hurt again.

Conner finished his career with 3,070 passing yards. His four-touchdown performance against Murray State in 2005 is tied for the second most in school history.

				Passing						Rushing			Receiving		
Year	Team	Pos	Games	C-A	Pct.	Yards	TD	INT	Rating	Att	Yds	TD	Rec	Yds	TD
2003	Mississippi State	WR	11	0-0	--	0	0	0	--	2	29	0	14	211	0
2004	Mississippi State	QB	9	107-206	51.9	1,224	6	7	104.7	67	115	1	0	0	0
2005	Mississippi State	QB→WR	11	86-167	51.5	903	8	5	106.7	44	-15	0	9	116	0
2006	Mississippi State	WR→QB	8	76-135	56.3	943	3	3	117.9	37	101	2	8	70	0
Career			39	269-508	53.0	3,070	17	15	108.9	150	230	3	31	397	0
