= Keyone Jenkins =

American football player

No. 12 – UCF Knights
- Position: Quarterback
- Class: Senior

Personal information
- Listed height: 6 ft 0 in (1.83 m)
- Listed weight: 200 lb (91 kg)

Career information
- High school: Miami Central (Miami, Florida)
- College: FIU (2023–2025); UCF (2026–present)
- Stats at ESPN

Keyone Jenkins is an American college football quarterback for the UCF Knights. He previously played for the FIU Panthers.

== Early life ==
Jenkins attended Miami Carol City Senior High School in Miami, Florida before transferring to Miami Central Senior High School. As a senior he threw for 2,282 yards and totaled 36 touchdowns to just four interceptions. Rated a three-star recruit, Jenkins originally committed to play for FIU before flipping to Auburn and once again choosing FIU.

== College career ==
=== FIU ===
Jenkins began the 2023 season as the backup quarterback to Grayson James. Following a Week 1 loss to Louisiana Tech, in which James passed for four net yards and FIU recorded 182 yards of total offense, Jenkins was named the starter for the following week's game against Maine. He made his collegiate and starting debut, completing 15 of 30 passes for 292 yards and two touchdowns with one interception in the victory. His 292 passing yards set an FIU record for the most in a game by a true freshman. The following week against North Texas, Jenkins threw two interceptions but overcame the turnovers by leading a game-winning drive in the fourth quarter, finishing with 291 passing yards and a touchdown in a 46–39 victory. The following week against UConn, he threw two touchdowns and rushed for another in his third consecutive victory. In Week 8 against Sam Houston, Jenkins completed 26 of 38 passes for 190 yards and threw the game-winning touchdown pass in double overtime in a 33–27 victory; he also rushed for a touchdown. On the season, Jenkins appeared in and started 11 games as FIU finished 4–8. He completed 194 of 332 passes for 2,414 yards, 11 touchdowns and 11 interceptions while adding six rushing touchdowns. Following the season, he was named to the Conference USA All-Freshman Team.

Jenkins returned as FIU's starting quarterback in 2024, starting all 12 games as the Panthers finished 4–8 for the second consecutive season. He threw multiple touchdown passes in seven games, including a career-high four against New Mexico State. He also threw for at least 300 yards in three games, including a career-high 362 yards against Monmouth. On the season, Jenkins completed 188 of 304 passes for 2,414 yards, 22 touchdowns and eight interceptions while rushing for 130 yards and two touchdowns. Following the season, Jenkins entered the NCAA transfer portal on December 2, 2024, but withdrew his name and returned to FIU on December 17.

Jenkins began his junior season as FIU's starting quarterback, starting the team's first eight games. Following a 3–5 start, Jenkins missed approximately a month with a groin injury, with Joe Pesansky taking over as the starter. Pesansky went 3–0 as the starter before suffering a toe injury, prompting Jenkins to return to the starting lineup in Week 12 against Sam Houston. Jenkins completed 15 of 24 passes for 291 yards and a season-high three touchdowns with one interception while adding a rushing touchdown in a 56–16 victory. In the First Responder Bowl against UTSA, Jenkins started at wide receiver before returning to quarterback after the game was out of reach. In his final game for FIU, he completed seven of 14 passes for 49 yards and an interception in the loss. FIU finished the season 7–6, including a 4–5 record in games started by Jenkins. He started 10 games, including nine at quarterback, and completed 164 of 263 passes for 1,742 yards, nine touchdowns and six interceptions while rushing for 132 yards and five touchdowns. Jenkins finished his FIU career ranked among the program's top 10 in several statistical categories, including third in passing yards with 6,713, tied for second in passing touchdowns with 42, third in total offense with 7,033 yards, and second in touchdowns responsible for with 55. On January 1, 2026, Jenkins entered the NCAA transfer portal.

=== UCF ===
On January 20, 2026, Jenkins transferred to UCF. He entered the 2026 season as the backup quarterback to Alonza Barnett III, who had been named UCF's starting quarterback by head coach Scott Frost. Jenkins made his Knights debut in the season opener against Bethune–Cookman, completing all four of his pass attempts for 42 yards and a touchdown in the victory. The following week against Pittsburgh, Barnett was injured late in the fourth quarter, and Jenkins entered the game for his only play, being sacked on a fourth-down conversion attempt in the loss. Jenkins started the following game against Georgia State, completing seven of 17 passes for 86 yards, a touchdown and an interception while rushing for two touchdowns in the victory. The following week against TCU, Jenkins completed 19 of 20 passes (95%) for 160 yards and a touchdown in a 21–13 victory, setting a UCF single-game record for completion percentage among quarterbacks with at least 15 pass attempts.

=== Statistics ===
Year	Team	Games			Passing								Rushing			
Year	Team	GP	GS	Record (Note: Accounts for only GS as a QB. On 12/26/25 Jenkins started at WR.)	Cmp	Att	Pct	Yds	Y/A	TD	Int	Rtg	Att	Yds	Avg	TD
2023	FIU	11	11	4–7	194	332	58.4	2,414	7.3	11	11	123.8	117	50	0.4	6
2024	FIU	12	12	4–8	188	304	61.8	2,557	8.4	22	8	151.1	75	130	1.7	2
2025	FIU	10	10	4–5	164	263	62.4	1,742	6.6	9	6	124.7	51	132	2.6	5
2026	UCF	7	5	3–2	108	159	67.9	1,099	6.9	11	3	144.9	42	76	1.8	4
Career		40	38	15−22	654	1,058	61.8	7,820	7.4	53	28	135.1	285	388	1.4	17
