= Wesley Carroll (quarterback) =

American football player (born 1988)

No. 13
- Position: Quarterback

Personal information
- Born: September 18, 1988 (age 38); Orange, California, U.S.
- Listed height: 6 ft 1 in (1.85 m)
- Listed weight: 203 lb (92 kg)

Career information
- High school: St. Thomas Aquinas (Fort Lauderdale, Florida)
- College: Mississippi State (2007–2008); FIU (2009–2011)

Awards and highlights
- 2007 All-SEC Freshman Team

Wesley Mason Carroll (born September 18, 1988) is an American former football quarterback. He played college football at Florida International University his junior and senior seasons, after transferring from Mississippi State University in January 2009.

== Early life ==
Carroll attended Cooperstown Central School in Cooperstown, New York from Grades 3 to 8. He and his family then moved to Ft. Lauderdale, Florida in the summer of 2003, where he then attended St. Thomas Aquinas High School that fall. There, he compiled a 38–5 record as the football team's starting quarterback from 2004–2006. He guided Aquinas to three consecutive state championship game appearances, all of which ended in losses to Lakeland High School, who was undefeated and appeared in USA Today's "Super 25" rankings in all three seasons. Aquinas was also ranked in the Super 25 while Carroll was there, 10th in 2005 and 21st in 2006.

In his final two seasons at Aquinas, he completed 189 of 342 pass attempts for over 3,300 yards and 53 touchdowns. He was a high school teammate of current Notre Dame offensive linemen Dan Wenger and Sam Young and former Florida defensive back Major Wright.

== College career ==
Carroll earned the starting quarterback spot as a true freshman at Mississippi State by out-playing incumbent starter Michael Henig. He was selected to the All-SEC freshman team and led the Bulldogs in their victory at the 2007 Liberty Bowl.

Despite entering the 2008 season as the Bulldogs' "clear starter", Carroll was replaced by Tyson Lee after some poor performances. Carroll subsequently decided to transfer to FIU.

During the 2010 season, Carroll led FIU to a 7–6 season (6–2 conference record) and to its first ever bowl berth and first ever bowl win against the Toledo Rockets at the 2010 Little Caesars Pizza Bowl. Carroll capitalized on his strong 2010 season by leading FIU to a record of 8–5 and a consecutive bowl game appearance in the Beef 'O' Brady's Bowl. His 2,623 passing yards, 16 passing touchdowns, and 2,615 yards of total offense in 2010 are school records.

Carroll attended the Battle of Florida All Star Game on January 21, 2012. He is now pursuing a master's degree in sport management.
