= Nick Turnbull =

American gridiron football player (born 1981)

No. 27, 40, 21
- Position: Safety

Personal information
- Born: July 28, 1981 (age 45); Miami, Florida, U.S.
- Listed height: 6 ft 2 in (1.88 m)
- Listed weight: 222 lb (101 kg)

Career information
- High school: Flanagan (Pembroke Pines, Florida)
- College: Florida International
- NFL draft: 2006: undrafted

Career history
- Atlanta Falcons (2006); Chicago Bears (2006); Atlanta Falcons (2007); Cincinnati Bengals (2007)*; Atlanta Falcons (2008)*; Las Vegas Locomotives (2009–2011); Ottawa Redblacks (2014)*
- * Offseason or practice squad member only

Awards and highlights
- 2× UFL champion (2009, 2010); Second-team All-Sun Belt (2005)
- Stats at Pro Football Reference

Nick Turnbull (born July 28, 1981) is a former professional gridiron football safety. He played college football for the FIU Golden Panthers.

== Early life and education ==
Turnbull is the son of James and Patricia Turnbull. He was raised in Carol City and Opa-locka, Florida. He attended Charles W. Flanagan High School in Pembroke Pines, Florida, where he played four years of football and three of basketball. He is a three-time All-County selection. He was named All-State after making 193 tackles and a county record 23 interceptions as a senior in high school and averaged 21.7 points and 13 rebounds for the Falcon basketball team. Turnbull was a student at Florida International University from 2002 to 2005.

== College career ==
Turnbull was on the FIU Golden Panthers football team. During his career there, he finished with 16 interceptions making him the school's all-time leader. He also ties for 1st in single-season and single-game interceptions, and is 6th on the career tackles list with 267.

== Professional career ==
He was signed by the Atlanta Falcons as an undrafted free agent from 2006 - 2008.

Turnbull was signed by the Las Vegas Locomotives of the United Football League from 2009 - 2011.

Turnbull has also played for the Chicago Bears and Cincinnati Bengals as a practive squad member.

He was one of the first three signings by the expansion Ottawa Redblacks on November 27, 2013, but retired before he could play for them.

== Personal ==
Turnbull lives in Miami, Florida. He is known as "The Truth". He modeled and appeared in GQ and Vogue. He is currently working in surgery.
