= Tourek Williams =

American football player (born 1991)

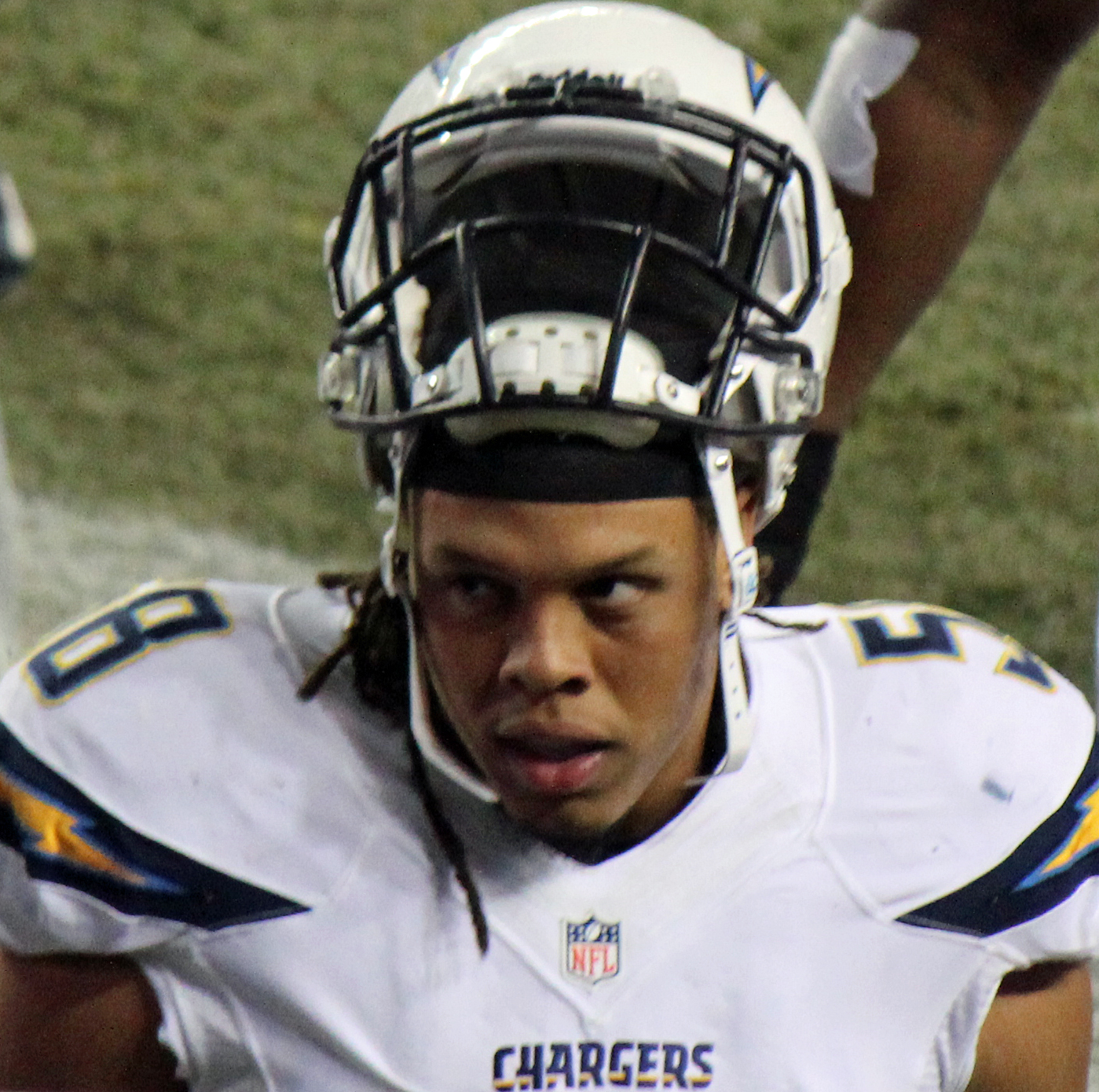
- Williams with the San Diego Chargers in 2013

No. 58
- Position: Outside linebacker

Personal information
- Born: May 9, 1991 (age 35); Tallahassee, Florida, U.S.
- Listed height: 6 ft 3 in (1.91 m)
- Listed weight: 260 lb (118 kg)

Career information
- High school: Miami Norland (Miami Gardens, Florida)
- College: FIU
- NFL draft: 2013: 6th round, 179th overall pick

Career history
- San Diego / Los Angeles Chargers (2013–2016); Kansas City Chiefs (2017)*
- * Offseason or practice squad member only

Awards and highlights
- First-team All-Sun Belt (2012); 2× Second-team All-Sun Belt (2010, 2011)

Career NFL statistics
- Total tackles: 53
- Sacks: 2.0
- Forced fumbles: 1
- Stats at Pro Football Reference

Tourek Williams (born May 9, 1991) is an American former professional football player who was an outside linebacker in the National Football League (NFL). He played college football for the FIU Panthers and was selected by the San Diego Chargers in the sixth round of the 2013 NFL draft.

== Early life and education ==
Williams attended Miami Norland Senior High School in Miami Gardens, Florida. After a great senior season, he was named an All-Dade County selection and District 12-6A first-team selection.

He was considered a two-star recruit by Rivals.com.

== College career ==
Williams attended Florida International University from 2009 to 2012. During his tenure, he collected 150 total tackles, including 45 for loss, 18 sacks, seven pass deflections, and two forced fumbles. He also record 18.0 sacks, which is second in school history. He earned All-Sun Belt honors three times during his career.

== Professional career ==
Pre-draft measurables
Height	Weight	Arm length	Hand span	40-yard dash	10-yard split	20-yard split	20-yard shuttle	Three-cone drill	Vertical jump	Broad jump	Bench press	Wonderlic
6 ft 3 in (1.91 m)	260 lb (118 kg)	32 1/2 in (0.83 m)	9 1/2 in (0.24 m)	4.92 s	-- s	-- s	-- s	-- s	33 in (0.84 m)	112 in (2.84 m)	17 reps	--
All values from NFL Combine

=== San Diego Chargers ===
Williams was selected by the San Diego Chargers in the sixth round (179th overall) of the 2013 NFL draft.

Williams played mostly special teams, but was forced into the starting lineup due to the injuries of Jarrett Johnson and Melvin Ingram. He played 13 games, starting 6, collecting 10 tackles, 1 sack, and a forced fumble.

=== Kansas City Chiefs ===
On May 22, 2017, Williams signed with the Kansas City Chiefs. He was waived on May 30, 2017.
