= 2019 Camellia Bowl =

Postseason college football bowl game

- 6th Camellia Bowl
FIU Panthers	Arkansas State Red Wolves
(6–6)	(7–5)
C-USA	Sun Belt
26	34
Head coach: Butch Davis	Head coach: Blake Anderson
	1	2	3	4	Total
FIU	0	13	10	3	26
Arkansas State	14	6	7	7	34
- Date: December 21, 2019
- Season: 2019
- Stadium: Cramton Bowl
- Location: Montgomery, Alabama
- MVP: Omar Bayless (WR, Arkansas State)
- Favorite: FIU by 1
- Referee: Steve Baron (Mountain West)
- Attendance: 16,209
- Payout: US$300,000

United States TV coverage
- Network: ESPN & ESPN Radio
- Announcers: ESPN: Taylor Zarzour (play-by-play), Matt Stinchcomb (analyst) and Alyssa Lang (sideline); ESPN Radio: Kevin Winter (play-by-play), Ben Hartsock (analyst) and Brad Edwards (sideline)

The 2019 Camellia Bowl was a college football bowl game played on December 21, 2019, with kickoff at 5:30 p.m. EST (4:30 p.m. local CST) on ESPN. It was the 6th edition of the Camellia Bowl, and one of the 2019–20 bowl games concluding the 2019 FBS football season. For 2019, the Camellia Bowl did not have a corporate naming sponsor.

== Teams ==
The bowl matched the FIU Panthers and the Arkansas State Red Wolves. This was the ninth meeting between the programs; entering the game, Arkansas State led the all-time series, 6–2 (officially 4–2, as two wins were vacated per NCAA sanctions). From 2005 to 2012, FIU and Arkansas State were both members of the Sun Belt Conference; their previous meetings spanned that era.

=== FIU Panthers ===
FIU finished their regular season with a 6–6 record (3–5 in conference). The Panthers tied with Middle Tennessee for fifth place in the East Division of Conference USA.

=== Arkansas State Red Wolves ===
Arkansas State finished their regular season with a 7–5 record (5–3 in conference). The Red Wolves finished in second place in the West Division of the Sun Belt. This was the program's second Camellia Bowl, making them the second team (after Appalachian State) to appear in multiple Camellia Bowls. The 2017 Red Wolves appeared in that season's Camellia Bowl, losing to Middle Tennessee, 35–30.

== Game summary ==
2019 Camellia Bowl

Quarter	1	2	3	4	Total
FIU	0	13	10	3	26
Arkansas State	14	6	7	7	34

at Cramton Bowl • Montgomery, Alabama

- Date: Saturday, December 21, 2019
- Game time: 5:30 p.m. EST (4:30 p.m. CST)
- Game weather: Light rain • Temperature: 52 °F (11 °C) • Wind: ENE 7 mph
- Game attendance: 16,209
- Referee: Steve Varon
- TV announcers (ESPN): Taylor Zarzour (play-by-play), Matt Stinchcomb (analyst) and Alyssa Lang (sideline)
- ESPN game summary

Game information

First Quarter

- (9:25) ARST – Layne Hatcher 4 yard pass to Omar Bayless, Blake Grupe kick (Drive: 15 plays, 80 yards, 3:17; Arkansas State 7–0)
- (0:55) ARST – Layne Hatcher 9 yard pass to Kirk Merritt, Blake Grupe kick (Drive: 13 plays, 90 yards, 3:35; Arkansas State 14–0)

Second Quarter

- (12:50) FIU – Napoleon Maxwell 3 yard rush, José Borregales kick (Drive: 9 plays, 71 yards, 3:05; Arkansas State 14–7)
- (9:31) ARST – Blake Grupe 46 yard field goal (Drive: 10 plays, 47 yards, 3:19; Arkansas State 17–7)
- (5:30) FIU – José Borregales 25 yard field goal (Drive: 8 plays, 47 yards, 4:01; Arkansas State 17–10)
- (3:05) ARST – Blake Grupe 37 yard field goal (Drive: 8 plays, 59 yards, 2:25; Arkansas State 20–10)
- (0:40) FIU – José Borregales 25 yard field goal (Drive: 10 plays, 70 yards, 2:25; Arkansas State 20–13)

Third Quarter

- (12:22) ARST – Layne Hatcher 15 yard pass to Reed Tyler, Blake Grupe kick (Drive: 11 plays, 74 yards, 2:38; Arkansas State 27–13)
- (3:48) FIU – James Morgan 19 yard pass to Austin Maloney, José Borregales kick (Drive: 2 plays, 23 yards, 0:48; Arkansas State 27–20)
- (0:38) FIU – José Borregales 48 yard field goal (Drive: 5 plays, 50 yards, 1:16; Arkansas State 27–23)

Fourth Quarter

- (11:52) FIU – José Borregales 52 yard field goal (Drive: 6 plays, 32 yards, 2:02; Arkansas State 27–26)
- (3:37) ARST – Layne Hatcher 13 yard pass to Jonathan Adams, Blake Grupe kick (Drive: 5 plays, 80 yards, 1:33; Arkansas State 34–26)

=== Statistics ===
Statistics	FIU	ARST
First downs	23	31
Plays–yards	74–444	89–525
Rushes–yards	35–132	37–132
Passing yards	312	393
Passing: comp–att–int	22–39–2	27–52–1
Time of possession	31:40	28:20

Team	Category	Player	Statistics
FIU	Passing	James Morgan	22/38, 312 yards, 1 TD, 2 INT
FIU	Rushing	Napoleon Maxwell	13 carries, 66 yards, 1 TD
FIU	Receiving	Austin Maloney	10 receptions, 178 yards, 1 TD
Arkansas State	Passing	Layne Hatcher	27/51, 393 yards, 4 TD, 1 INT
Arkansas State	Rushing	Jamal Jones	10 carries, 59 yards,
Arkansas State	Receiving	Omar Bayless	9 receptions, 180 yards, 1 TD
