= Kris Mitchell =

American football player (born 2000)

Profile
- Position: Wide receiver

Personal information
- Born: November 2, 2000 (age 26); Dacula, Georgia, U.S.
- Listed height: 5 ft 11 in (1.80 m)
- Listed weight: 182 lb (83 kg)

Career information
- High school: Mandarin (Jacksonville, Florida)
- College: FIU (2019–2023); Notre Dame (2024)
- NFL draft: 2025: undrafted

Awards and highlights
- Second team All-CUSA (2023)

Kris Mitchell (born November 2, 2000) is an American professional football wide receiver. He played college football for the FIU Panthers and Notre Dame Fighting Irish.

== Early life ==
Mitchell attended Mandarin High School in Jacksonville, Florida. As a senior, Mitchell totaled eleven touchdowns, helping lead Mandarin to a state title, before committing to play college football at Florida International University.

== College career ==
=== FIU ===
After redshirting in 2019 and playing sparingly the following two seasons, Mitchell recorded 23 receptions for 348 yards and four touchdowns in 2022. Against Maine during the 2023 season, he hauled in a career-high 201 receiving yards and two touchdowns en route to a 14–12 victory. Mitchell finished the season with an FIU school-record for receiving yards in a season with 1,118 yards to go along with 64 receptions and seven touchdowns. On November 28, 2023, Mitchell announced that he would be entering the transfer portal.

=== Notre Dame ===
On December 5, 2023, Mitchell announced that he would be transferring to the University of Notre Dame to play for the Notre Dame Fighting Irish.

=== College statistics ===
Year	Team	GP	Receiving			
Year	Team	GP	Rec	Yds	Avg	TD
2019	FIU	0	Did not play			
2020	FIU	4	4	39	9.8	0
2021	FIU	10	9	158	17.6	1
2022	FIU	12	23	348	15.1	4
2023	FIU	12	64	1,118	17.5	6
2024	Notre Dame	16	22	224	10.2	2
Career		54	122	1,887	15.5	13

== Professional career ==
Pre-draft measurables
Height	Weight	Arm length	Hand span	40-yard dash	10-yard split	20-yard split	20-yard shuttle	Three-cone drill	Vertical jump	Broad jump	Bench press
5 ft 11 1/4 in (1.81 m)	182 lb (83 kg)	31 1/2 in (0.80 m)	8 1/8 in (0.21 m)	4.50 s	1.56 s	2.63 s	4.45 s	7.04 s	36.5 in (0.93 m)	9 ft 10 in (3.00 m)	9 reps
All values from Pro Day

In May 2025, he attended rookie minicamp for the Las Vegas Raiders. In August 2025, he worked out for the Seattle Seahawks.
