= D'Vonte Price =

American football player (born 1999)

Profile
- Position: Running back

Personal information
- Born: June 2, 1999 (age 27); Punta Gorda, Florida, U.S.
- Listed height: 6 ft 1 in (1.85 m)
- Listed weight: 210 lb (95 kg)

Career information
- High school: Charlotte (Punta Gorda)
- College: FIU (2017–2021)
- NFL draft: 2022: undrafted

Career history
- Indianapolis Colts (2022); BC Lions (2025)*
- * Offseason or practice squad member only
- Stats at Pro Football Reference

D'Vonte Price (born June 2, 1999) is an American professional football running back. He played college football for the FIU Panthers.

== Early life ==
Price grew up in Punta Gorda, Florida and attended Charlotte High School. Over the course of his high school career he rushed for 1,265 yards and scored 23 total touchdowns in 32 games played.

== College career ==
Price played primarily as a backup running back with occasional starts during his first two seasons with the FIU Panthers. As a junior, Price gained 249 yards on 50 carries and caught ten passes for 49 yards. He rushed for 581 yards and four touchdowns on 85 carries in five games during FIU's COVID-19-shortened 2020 season. After considering declaring for the 2021 NFL Draft, Price decided to utilize the extra year of eligibility granted to college athletes who played in the 2020 season due to the coronavirus pandemic and return to FIU for a fifth season. He rushed 128 times for 682 yards and six touchdowns in his final season.

== Professional career ==
Pre-draft measurables
Height	Weight	Arm length	Hand span	Wingspan	40-yard dash	10-yard split	20-yard split	20-yard shuttle	Three-cone drill	Vertical jump	Broad jump
6 ft 1 3/8 in (1.86 m)	210 lb (95 kg)	31 1/2 in (0.80 m)	9 3/8 in (0.24 m)	6 ft 4 3/4 in (1.95 m)	4.38 s	1.54 s	2.56 s	4.47 s	7.59 s	34.0 in (0.86 m)	9 ft 11 in (3.02 m)
All values from NFL Combine/Pro Day

=== Indianapolis Colts ===
Price signed with the Indianapolis Colts as an undrafted free agent on April 30, 2022. He was waived on August 30, and signed to the practice squad the next day. On October 15, Price was elevated to the active roster for the Colts' Week 6 game against the Jacksonville Jaguars, following injuries to starting running backs Jonathan Taylor and Nyheim Hines. He played two snaps in his debut, both of which on special teams, and did not register a tackle.

On January 16, 2023, Price's practice squad deal expired, making him a free agent.

=== BC Lions ===
On January 23, 2025, Price signed with the BC Lions of the Canadian Football League (CFL). He was released on April 22, 2025.
