= 2012 FIU Panthers football team =

American college football season

2012 FIU Panthers football
- Conference: Sun Belt Conference
- Record: 3–9 (2–6 Sun Belt)
- Head coach: Mario Cristobal (6th season)
- Offensive coordinator: Tim Cramsey (1st season)
- Offensive scheme: Spread
- Defensive coordinator: Todd Orlando (2nd season)
- Base defense: 3–3–5
- Home stadium: FIU Stadium

2012 Sun Belt Conference football standings
	Conf.			Overall
Team	W		L	W		L
Arkansas State $	7	–	1	10	–	3
Louisiana–Monroe	6	–	2	8	–	5
Middle Tennessee	6	–	2	8	–	4
Louisiana–Lafayette *	4	–	2	5	–	4
Western Kentucky	4	–	4	7	–	6
Troy	3	–	5	5	–	7
North Texas	3	–	5	4	–	8
Florida Atlantic	2	–	6	3	–	9
FIU	2	–	6	3	–	9
South Alabama **	1	–	7	2	–	11
$ – Conference champion; * – Louisiana–Lafayette vacated 4 wins due to NCAA violations. ** – South Alabama was ineligible for the conference title or a bowl game as part of their transition to the FBS.

The 2012 FIU Panthers football team represented Florida International University during the 2012 NCAA Division I FBS football season. They were led by sixth year head coach Mario Cristobal and played their home games at FIU Stadium. They were a member of the Sun Belt Conference. This was the Panthers final season as members of the Sun Belt as they have accepted an invitation to join Conference USA on July 1, 2013. They were a member of the Sun Belt Conference. They finished the season 3–9, 2–6 in Sun Belt play to finish in a tie for eighth place. Head coach Mario Cristobal was fired at the end of the season after posting a 27–47 record in six seasons.

== Schedule ==
Date	Time	Opponent	Site	TV	Result	Attendance
September 1	7:00 p.m.	at Duke*	Wallace Wade Stadium; Durham, NC	ESPN3	L 26–46	31,117
September 8	6:00 p.m.	Akron*	FIU Stadium; Miami, FL	ESPN3	W 41–38 ^{OT}	15,685
September 15	4:00 p.m.	at UCF*	Bright House Networks Stadium; Orlando, FL	CSS	L 20–33	40,478
September 22	7:00 p.m.	No. 20 Louisville*	FIU Stadium; Miami, FL	ESPN3	L 21–28	12,318
September 29	7:00 p.m.	at Louisiana–Lafayette	Cajun Field; Lafayette, LA	ESPN3	L 20–48	21,109
October 4	7:30 p.m.	Arkansas State	FIU Stadium; Miami, FL	ESPNU	L 20–34	13,612
October 13	6:00 p.m.	Middle Tennessee^{†}	FIU Stadium; Miami, FL		L 30–34	15,234
October 20	1:00 p.m.	at Troy	Veterans Memorial Stadium; Troy, AL	SBN/ESPN3	L 37–38	17,354
October 27	6:00 p.m.	Western Kentucky	FIU Stadium; Miami, FL	ESPN3	L 6–14	12,842
November 3	3:30 p.m.	at South Alabama	Ladd-Peebles Stadium; Mobile, AL		W 28–20	11,936
November 16	8:00 p.m.	at Florida Atlantic	FAU Stadium; Boca Raton, FL (Shula Bowl)	ESPNU	W 34–24	15,405
November 24	6:00 p.m.	Louisiana–Monroe	FIU Stadium; Miami, FL		L 17–23 ^{OT}	12,115
*Non-conference game; ^{†}Homecoming; Rankings from Coaches' Poll released prior to the game; All times are in Eastern time

- Source: Schedule

== Game summaries ==
=== @ Duke ===
	1	2	3	4	Total
Panthers	7	7	0	12	26
Blue Devils	7	30	7	2	46

=== Akron ===
	1	2	3	4	OT	Total
Zips	7	13	0	18	0	38
Panthers	7	7	7	17	3	41

=== @ UCF ===
	1	2	3	4	Total
Panthers	0	0	14	6	20
Knights	9	14	7	3	33

=== Louisville ===
	1	2	3	4	Total
#18 Cardinals	7	7	7	7	28
Panthers	7	7	0	7	21

=== @ Louisiana–Lafayette ===
	1	2	3	4	Total
Panthers	0	14	6	0	20
Ragin' Cajuns	17	14	10	7	48

=== Arkansas State ===
	1	2	3	4	Total
Red Wolves	0	14	13	7	34
Panthers	3	7	3	7	20

=== Middle Tennessee ===
	1	2	3	4	Total
Blue Raiders	3	7	7	17	34
Panthers	6	14	3	7	30

=== @ Troy ===
	1	2	3	4	Total
Panthers	21	3	13	0	37
Trojans	7	7	14	10	38

=== WKU ===
	1	2	3	4	Total
Hilltoppers	7	0	0	7	14
Pantheres	3	0	0	3	6

=== @ South Alabama ===
	1	2	3	4	Total
Panthers	14	14	0	0	28
Jaguars	7	0	10	3	20

=== @ Florida Atlantic ===
	1	2	3	4	Total
Panthers	7	7	13	7	34
Owls	0	10	7	7	24

=== Louisiana–Monroe ===
	1	2	3	4	OT	Total
Warhawks	7	3	7	0	6	23
Panthers	0	7	3	7	0	17
