= 2002 FIU Golden Panthers football team =

American college football season

2002 FIU Golden Panthers football
- Conference: Independent
- Record: 5–6
- Head coach: Don Strock (1st season)
- Offensive coordinator: Greg Briner (1st season)
- Offensive scheme: Pro-style
- Base defense: 4–3
- Home stadium: FIU Stadium

2002 NCAA Division I-AA independents football standings
| | Conf. | | | Overall |
| Team | W | | L | W | | L |
|---|---|---|---|---|---|---|
| Saint Mary's | | – | | 6 | – | 6 |
| FIU | | – | | 5 | – | 6 |
| Samford | | – | | 4 | – | 7 |
| Cal Poly | | – | | 3 | – | 8 |
| Florida Atlantic | | – | | 2 | – | 9 |
| Savannah State | | – | | 1 | – | 8 |
| Southern Utah | | – | | 1 | – | 10 |
| Morris Brown | | – | | 1 | – | 11 |

The 2002 FIU Golden Panthers football team represented Florida International University (FIU) as an independent during the 2002 NCAA Division I-AA football season. Led by first-year head coach Don Strock, the Panthers compiled a record of 5–6. The team played home game at FIU Stadium in Miami.

FIU played its first-ever game on August 29, 2002 against Saint Peter's, winning 27–3.

== Schedule ==
| Date | Opponent | Site | Result | Attendance | Source |
|---|---|---|---|---|---|
| August 29 | Saint Peter's | FIU Stadium; Miami, FL | W 27–3 | 17,314 | |
| September 7 | at Elon | Rhodes Stadium; Elon, NC | L 22–23 | 5,580 | |
| September 14 | Butler | FIU Stadium; Miami, FL | W 42–0 | 9,110 | |
| September 21 | vs. No. 24 Bethune–Cookman | Lockhart Stadium; Fort Lauderdale, FL | L 0–31 | 16,386 | |
| September 28 | Georgetown | FIU Stadium; Miami, FL | W 27–2 | 6,084 | |
| October 12 | at Western Kentucky | L. T. Smith Stadium; Bowling Green, KY | L 7–56 | 6,000 | |
| October 19 | No. 8 Maine | FIU Stadium; Miami, FL | L 7–33 | 5,303 | |
| October 26 | Gardner–Webb^{†} | FIU Stadium; Miami, FL | L 14–17 | 6,733 | |
| October 31 | Jacksonville | FIU Stadium; Miami, FL | W 39–6 | 5,221 | |
| November 9 | Albany | FIU Stadium; Miami, FL | W 35–26 | 4,588 | |
| November 23 | at Florida Atlantic | Pro Player Stadium; Miami Gardens, FL (Shula Bowl) | L 21–31 | 10,224 | |
^{†}Homecoming; Rankings from The Sports Network Poll released prior to the game

== Game summaries ==
=== Saint Peter's ===
Saint Peter's Peacocks at FIU Golden Panthers – Game summary

| Quarter | 1 | 2 | 3 | 4 | Total |
|---|---|---|---|---|---|
| Peacocks | 0 | 0 | 3 | 0 | 3 |
| Golden Panthers | 13 | 14 | 0 | 0 | 27 |

at FIU Stadium, Miami, Florida

- Date: August 29
- Game time: 7:30 p.m. EDT
- Game weather: Partly cloudy, 83 °F (28 °C)
- Game attendance: 17,314
- Box score

Game information
First quarter
- FIU – Jerrid Lundstedt 5-yard pass from Jamie Burke (Adam Moss kick), 8:18. Golden Panthers 7–0. Drive: 5 plays, 36 yards, 2:54.
- FIU – Jamie Burke 6-yard run (kick failed), 1:47. Golden Panthers 13–0. Drive: 7 plays, 34 yards, 3:05.

Second quarter

- FIU – Rashod Smith 2-yard run (kick failed), 9:27. Golden Panthers 19–0. Drive: 6 plays, 69 yards, 2:58.
- FIU – Cory McKinney 52-yard pass from Jamie Burke (Jamie Burke pass to Rashod Smith), 2:31. Golden Panthers 27–0. Drive: 5 plays, 75 yards, 1:32.

Third quarter

- SPC – James Galea 32-yard field goal, 1:51. Golden Panthers 27–3. Drive: 12 plays, 46 yards, 4:33.

Fourth quarter

- No scoring plays

| Statistics | SPC | FIU |
|---|---|---|
| First downs | 14 | 10 |
| Total yards | 197 | 236 |
| Rushing yards | 121 | 69 |
| Passing yards | 76 | 167 |
| Turnovers | 3 | 2 |
| Time of possession | 32:31 | 27:10 |

| Team | Category | Player | Statistics |
|---|---|---|---|
| Saint Peter's | Passing | Mike Seber | 4/10, 48 yards |
| Saint Peter's | Rushing | Derek Clayton | 18 rushes, 61 yards |
| Saint Peter's | Receiving | Chris Eckhart | 1 reception, 20 yards |
| FIU | Passing | Jamie Burke | 10/13, 115 yards, 2 TD |
| FIU | Rushing | Rashod Smith | 11 rushes, 45 yards, TD |
| FIU | Receiving | Cory McKinney | 3 receptions, 104 yards, TD |

=== At Elon ===
FIU Golden Panthers at Elon Phoenix – Game summary

| Quarter | 1 | 2 | 3 | 4 | Total |
|---|---|---|---|---|---|
| Golden Panthers | 7 | 9 | 6 | 0 | 22 |
| Phoenix | 7 | 6 | 7 | 3 | 23 |

at Rhodes Stadium, Elon, North Carolina

- Date: September 7
- Game time: 7:00 p.m. EDT
- Game weather: Clear, 79 °F (26 °C)
- Game attendance: 5,580
- Referee: Flemon Williams
- Box score

Game information
First quarter
- FIU – Rashod Smith 6-yard run (Doug Jones kick), 12:27. Golden Panthers 7–0. Drive: 5 plays, 31 yards, 2:20.
- ELON – Rashaud Palmer 1-yard run (Anthony Turowski kick), 6:48. Tied 7–7. Drive: 10 plays, 74 yards, 5:39.

Second quarter

- FIU – Adam Moss 33-yard field goal, 9:42. Golden Panthers 10–7. Drive: 11 plays, 64 yards, 5:08.
- FIU – Harold Leath 23-yard pass from David Tabor (kick failed), 8:47. Golden Panthers 16–7. Drive: 3 plays, 27 yards, 0:33.
- ELON – Rashaud Palmer 1-yard run (kick blocked), 0:40. Golden Panthers 16–13. Drive: 5 plays, 63 yards, 2:00.

Third quarter

- ELON – Arketa Banks 4-yard pass from C. W. Singletary (Anthony Turowski kick), 8:54. Phoenix 20–16. Drive: 6 plays, 25 yards, 2:55.
- FIU – Harold Leath 68-yard pass from Jamie Burke (kick failed), 6:00. Golden Panthers 22–20. Drive: 6 plays, 86 yards, 2:54.

Fourth quarter

- ELON – Anthony Turowski 23-yard field goal, 2:52. Phoenix 23–22. Drive: 19 plays, 72 yards, 9:26.

| Statistics | FIU | ELON |
|---|---|---|
| First downs | 14 | 23 |
| Total yards | 335 | 405 |
| Rushing yards | 46 | 377 |
| Passing yards | 289 | 28 |
| Turnovers | 2 | 5 |
| Time of possession | 25:23 | 34:37 |

| Team | Category | Player | Statistics |
|---|---|---|---|
| FIU | Passing | Jamie Burke | 13/26, 257 yards, TD, INT |
| FIU | Rushing | Rashod Smith | 17 rushes, 81 yards, TD |
| FIU | Receiving | Harold Leath | 4 receptions, 141 yards, 2 TD |
| Elon | Passing | C. W. Singletary | 4/9, 28 yards, TD, INT |
| Elon | Rushing | Rashaud Palmer | 20 rushes, 94 yards, 2 TD |
| Elon | Receiving | Arketa Banks | 2 receptions, 10 yards, TD |

=== Butler ===
Butler Bulldogs at FIU Golden Panthers – Game summary

| Quarter | 1 | 2 | 3 | 4 | Total |
|---|---|---|---|---|---|
| Bulldogs | 0 | 0 | 0 | 0 | 0 |
| Golden Panthers | 21 | 14 | 7 | 0 | 42 |

at FIU Stadium, Miami, Florida

- Date: September 14
- Game time: 3:30 p.m. EDT
- Game weather: Humid and sunny, 87 °F (31 °C)
- Game attendance: 9,110
- Referee: J. Rider
- Box score

Game information
First quarter
- FIU – Rashod Smith 25-yard run (Adam Moss kick), 14:12. Golden Panthers 7–0. Drive: 2 plays, 50 yards, 0:48.
- FIU – Julius Eppinger 23-yard pass from Jamie Burke (Adam Moss kick), 13:53. Golden Panthers 14–0. Drive: 1 play, 23 yards, 0:19.
- FIU – Rashod Smith 39-yard run (Adam Moss kick), 8:24. Golden Panthers 21–0. Drive: 3 plays, 66 yards, 1:38.

Second quarter

- FIU – Cory McKinney 58-yard pass from Jamie Burke (Adam Moss kick), 11:00. Golden Panthers 28–0. Drive: 3 plays, 52 yards, 0:56.
- FIU – Rashod Smith 16-yard run (Adam Moss kick), 0:47. Golden Panthers 35–0. Drive: 9 plays, 65 yards, 2:47.

Third quarter

- FIU – Harold Leath 9-yard pass from Jamie Burke (Adam Moss kick), 9:37. Golden Panthers 42–0. Drive: 7 plays, 50 yards, 2:10.

Fourth quarter

- No scoring plays

| Statistics | BUT | FIU |
|---|---|---|
| First downs | 13 | 20 |
| Total yards | 212 | 455 |
| Rushing yards | 94 | 197 |
| Passing yards | 118 | 258 |
| Turnovers | 3 | 1 |
| Time of possession | 32:35 | 27:25 |

| Team | Category | Player | Statistics |
|---|---|---|---|
| Butler | Passing | Travis Delph | 9/21, 101 yards |
| Butler | Rushing | Justin Campbell | 10 rushes, 65 yards |
| Butler | Receiving | Adam Lafferty | 4 receptions, 56 yards |
| FIU | Passing | Jamie Burke | 13/19, 258 yards, 3 TD, INT |
| FIU | Rushing | Rashod Smith | 14 rushes, 116 yards, 3 TD |
| FIU | Receiving | Cory McKinney | 4 receptions, 107 yards, TD |

=== Vs. No. 24 Bethune–Cookman ===
FIU Golden Panthers vs. No. 24 Bethune–Cookman Wildcats – Game summary

| Quarter | 1 | 2 | 3 | 4 | Total |
|---|---|---|---|---|---|
| Golden Panthers | 0 | 0 | 0 | 0 | 0 |
| No. 24 Wildcats | 10 | 14 | 0 | 7 | 31 |

at Lockhart Stadium, Fort Lauderdale, Florida

- Date: September 21
- Game time: 5:00 p.m. EDT
- Game weather: Hot, 86 °F (30 °C)
- Game attendance: 16,386
- Referee: Preston Harding
- Box score

Game information
First quarter
- BCC – Rodney Johnson 20-yard run (Daniel King kick), 8:18. Wildcats 7–0. Drive: 10 plays, 75 yards, 4:30.
- BCC – Daniel King 24-yard field goal, 0:05. Wildcats 10–0. Drive: 11 plays, 59 yards, 6:00.

Second quarter

- BCC – Rashean Mathis 26-yard fumble return (Daniel King kick), 14:06. Wildcats 17–0.
- BCC – Lamont Finnie 3-yard run (Daniel King kick), 0:13. Wildcats 24–0. Drive: 3 plays, 22 yards, 0:17.

Third quarter

- No scoring plays

Fourth quarter

- BCC – Allen Suber 1-yard run (Daniel King kick), 4:37. Wildcats 31–0. Drive: 7 plays, 89 yards, 3:55.

| Statistics | FIU | BCC |
|---|---|---|
| First downs | 10 | 24 |
| Total yards | 68 | 496 |
| Rushing yards | -16 | 317 |
| Passing yards | 84 | 179 |
| Turnovers | 4 | 4 |
| Time of possession | 24:38 | 35:22 |

| Team | Category | Player | Statistics |
|---|---|---|---|
| FIU | Passing | Jamie Burke | 9/18, 84 yards, INT |
| FIU | Rushing | Rashod Smith | 14 rushes, 58 yards |
| FIU | Receiving | Julius Eppinger | 2 receptions, 25 yards |
| Bethune–Cookman | Passing | Allen Suber | 10/15, 179 yards, 2 INT |
| Bethune–Cookman | Rushing | Rodney Johnson | 7 rushes, 80 yards, TD |
| Bethune–Cookman | Receiving | Unri Thomas | 1 reception, 74 yards |

=== Georgetown ===
Georgetown Hoyas at FIU Golden Panthers – Game summary

| Quarter | 1 | 2 | 3 | 4 | Total |
|---|---|---|---|---|---|
| Hoyas | 2 | 0 | 0 | 0 | 2 |
| Golden Panthers | 6 | 21 | 0 | 0 | 27 |

at FIU Stadium, Miami, Florida

- Date: September 28
- Game time: 1:00 p.m. EDT
- Game weather: Partly cloudy, 90 °F (32 °C)
- Game attendance: 6,084
- Referee: A. Riveron
- Box score

Game information
First quarter
- GU – Doug Jones blocked punt out of own end zone, 13:14. Hoyas 2–0.
- FIU – Adam Gorman 17-yard pass from Jamie Burke (kick blocked), 2:34. Panthers 6–2. Drive: 11 plays, 59 yards, 4:55.

Second quarter

- FIU – Joe Struyf 38-yard pass from Jamie Burke (Adam Moss kick), 13:04. Panthers 13–2. Drive: 4 plays, 73 yards, 1:56.
- FIU – Rashod Smith 28-yard run (Adam Moss kick), 7:23. Panthers 20–2. Drive: 5 plays, 38 yards, 3:10.
- FIU – Cory McKinney 39-yard pass from David Tabor (Adam Moss kick), 0:38. Panthers 27–2. Drive: 6 plays, 58 yards, 2:20.

Third quarter

- No scoring plays

Fourth quarter

- No scoring plays

| Statistics | GU | FIU |
|---|---|---|
| First downs | 12 | 19 |
| Total yards | 196 | 433 |
| Rushing yards | 76 | 210 |
| Passing yards | 120 | 223 |
| Turnovers | 1 | 0 |
| Time of possession | 27:07 | 32:53 |

| Team | Category | Player | Statistics |
|---|---|---|---|
| Georgetown | Passing | Andre Crawford | 9/21, 120 yards |
| Georgetown | Rushing | William Huisking | 7 rushes, 33 yards |
| Georgetown | Receiving | Walter Bowser | 4 receptions, 61 yards |
| FIU | Passing | Jamie Burke | 8/11, 126 yards, 2 TD |
| FIU | Rushing | Rashod Smith | 8 rushes, 76 yards, TD |
| FIU | Receiving | Cory McKinney | 3 receptions, 76 yards, TD |

=== At Western Kentucky ===
FIU Golden Panthers at Western Kentucky Hilltoppers – Game summary

| Quarter | 1 | 2 | 3 | 4 | Total |
|---|---|---|---|---|---|
| Golden Panthers | 0 | 0 | 0 | 7 | 7 |
| Hilltoppers | 21 | 21 | 0 | 14 | 56 |

at L. T. Smith Stadium, Bowling Green, Kentucky

- Date: October 12
- Game time: 5:30 p.m. EDT/4:30 p.m. CDT
- Game weather: 77 °F (25 °C)
- Game attendance: 6,000
- Referee: Bill Etzler
- Box score

Game information
First quarter
- WKU – Jason Michael 7-yard run (Peter Martinez kick), 9:53. Hilltoppers 7–0. Drive: 8 plays, 48 yards, 3:13.
- WKU – Jon Frazier 3-yard run (Peter Martinez kick), 7:10. Hilltoppers 14–0. Drive: 4 plays, 45 yards, 1:48.
- WKU – Jason Michael 8-yard run (Peter Martinez kick), 1:59. Hilltoppers 21–0. Drive: 6 plays, 42 yards, 2:58.

Second quarter

- WKU – Jerome Reaves 25-yard pass from Jason Michael (Peter Martinez kick), 10:53. Hilltoppers 28–0. Drive: 7 plays, 50 yards, 3:40.
- WKU – Jason Michael 1-yard run (Peter Martinez kick), 7:18. Hilltoppers 35–0. Drive: 7 plays, 49 yards, 3:21.
- WKU – Patrick Reynolds 1-yard fumble return (Peter Martinez kick), 5:42. Hilltoppers 42–0.

Third quarter

- No scoring plays

Fourth quarter

- WKU – Maurice Bradley 3-yard run (Wilson Wickerham kick), 13:45. Hilltoppers 49–0. Drive: 9 plays, 80 yards, 4:23.
- FIU – Cory McKinney 2-yard pass from David Tabor (Adam Moss kick), 11:02. Hilltoppers 49–7. Drive: 3 plays, 2 yards, 0:49.
- WKU – Alex Dukes 1-yard run (Matt Lange kick), 3:19. Hilltoppers 56–7. Drive: 13 plays, 69 yards, 7:43.

| Statistics | FIU | WKU |
|---|---|---|
| First downs | 7 | 28 |
| Total yards | 65 | 498 |
| Rushing yards | -7 | 401 |
| Passing yards | 72 | 97 |
| Turnovers | 5 | 3 |
| Time of possession | 23:13 | 36:47 |

| Team | Category | Player | Statistics |
|---|---|---|---|
| FIU | Passing | Jamie Burke | 5/14, 75 yards, 4 INT |
| FIU | Rushing | Rashod Smith | 6 rushes, 21 yards |
| FIU | Receiving | Harold Leath | 2 receptions, 38 yards |
| Western Kentucky | Passing | Jason Michael | 6/10, 97 yards, TD, INT |
| Western Kentucky | Rushing | Jon Frazier | 15 rushes, 126 yards, TD |
| Western Kentucky | Receiving | Jeremi Johnson | 2 receptions, 45 yards |

=== No. 8 Maine ===
No. 8 Maine Black Bears at FIU Golden Panthers – Game summary

| Quarter | 1 | 2 | 3 | 4 | Total |
|---|---|---|---|---|---|
| No. 8 Black Bears | 3 | 14 | 6 | 10 | 33 |
| Golden Panthers | 0 | 0 | 0 | 7 | 7 |

at FIU Stadium, Miami, Florida

- Date: October 19
- Game time: 3:30 p.m. EDT
- Game weather: Sunny, 83 °F (28 °C)
- Game attendance: 5,303
- Referee: Perry Havener
- Box score

Game information
First quarter
- ME – Mike Mellow 41-yard field goal, 4:13. Black Bears 3–0. Drive: 6 plays, 14 yards, 1:00.

Second quarter

- ME – Jake Eaton 1-yard run (Mike Mellow kick), 12:13. Black Bears 10–0. Drive: 7 plays, 74 yards, 2:47.
- ME – Ryan Waller 4-yard pass from Jake Eaton (Mike Mellow kick), 4:39. Black Bears 17–0. Drive: 7 plays, 48 yards, 3:20.

Third quarter

- ME – Ryan Waller 9-yard pass from Jake Eaton (kick failed), 7:35. Black Bears 23–0. Drive: 7 plays, 54 yards, 4:03.

Fourth quarter

- ME – Marcus Williams 1-yard run (Mike Mellow kick), 8:54. Black Bears 30–0. Drive: 5 plays, 62 yards, 2:05.
- ME – Mike Mellow 28-yard field goal, 1:40. Black Bears 33–0. Drive: 4 plays, 3 yards, 2:09.
- FIU – Tori Robinson 1-yard run (Adam Moss kick), 0:12. Black Bears 33–7. Drive: 4 plays, 68 yards, 1:28.

| Statistics | ME | FIU |
|---|---|---|
| First downs | 24 | 10 |
| Total yards | 412 | 209 |
| Rushing yards | 218 | 28 |
| Passing yards | 194 | 181 |
| Turnovers | 1 | 5 |
| Time of possession | 32:06 | 27:54 |

| Team | Category | Player | Statistics |
|---|---|---|---|
| Maine | Passing | Jake Eaton | 18/28, 187 yards, 2 TD |
| Maine | Rushing | Marcus Williams | 22 rushes, 156 yards, TD |
| Maine | Receiving | Ryan Waller | 6 receptions, 66 yards, 2 TD |
| FIU | Passing | Jamie Burke | 9/18, 106 yards, 2 INT |
| FIU | Rushing | Tori Robinson | 5 rushes, 54 yards, TD |
| FIU | Receiving | Cory McKinney | 5 receptions, 111 yards |

=== Gardber–Webb ===
Gardner–Webb Runnin' Bulldogs at FIU Golden Panthers – Game summary

| Quarter | 1 | 2 | 3 | 4 | Total |
|---|---|---|---|---|---|
| Runnin' Bulldogs | 7 | 3 | 0 | 7 | 17 |
| Golden Panthers | 0 | 14 | 0 | 0 | 14 |

at FIU Stadium, Miami, Florida

- Date: October 26
- Game time: 3:30 p.m. EDT
- Game weather: Humid, 88 °F (31 °C)
- Game attendance: 6,733
- Referee: M. Lewis
- Box score

| Statistics | GWU | FIU |
|---|---|---|
| First downs | | |
| Total yards | | |
| Rushing yards | | |
| Passing yards | | |
| Turnovers | | |
| Time of possession | | |

| Team | Category | Player | Statistics |
|---|---|---|---|
| Gardner–Webb | Passing | | |
| Gardner–Webb | Rushing | | |
| Gardner–Webb | Receiving | | |
| FIU | Passing | | |
| FIU | Rushing | | |
| FIU | Receiving | | |

=== Jacksonville ===
Jacksonville Dolphins at FIU Golden Panthers – Game summary

| Quarter | 1 | 2 | 3 | 4 | Total |
|---|---|---|---|---|---|
| Dolphins | 0 | 6 | 0 | 0 | 6 |
| Golden Panthers | 3 | 10 | 26 | 0 | 39 |

at FIU Stadium, Miami, Florida

- Date: October 31
- Game time: 8:00 p.m. EST
- Game weather: Partly cloudy, 82 °F (28 °C)
- Game attendance: 5,221
- Referee: A. Riveron
- Box score

| Statistics | JU | FIU |
|---|---|---|
| First downs | | |
| Total yards | | |
| Rushing yards | | |
| Passing yards | | |
| Turnovers | | |
| Time of possession | | |

| Team | Category | Player | Statistics |
|---|---|---|---|
| Jacksonville | Passing | | |
| Jacksonville | Rushing | | |
| Jacksonville | Receiving | | |
| FIU | Passing | | |
| FIU | Rushing | | |
| FIU | Receiving | | |

=== Albany ===
Albany Great Danes at FIU Golden Panthers – Game summary

| Quarter | 1 | 2 | 3 | 4 | Total |
|---|---|---|---|---|---|
| Great Danes | 7 | 13 | 0 | 6 | 26 |
| Golden Panthers | 0 | 0 | 28 | 7 | 35 |

at FIU Stadium, Miami, Florida

- Date: November 9
- Game time: 3:30 p.m. EST
- Game weather: Partly cloudy, 85 °F (29 °C)
- Game attendance: 4,588
- Referee: S. Frederickson
- Box score

| Statistics | ALB | FIU |
|---|---|---|
| First downs | | |
| Total yards | | |
| Rushing yards | | |
| Passing yards | | |
| Turnovers | | |
| Time of possession | | |

| Team | Category | Player | Statistics |
|---|---|---|---|
| Albany | Passing | | |
| Albany | Rushing | | |
| Albany | Receiving | | |
| FIU | Passing | | |
| FIU | Rushing | | |
| FIU | Receiving | | |

=== At Florida Atlantic ===
FIU Golden Panthers at Florida Atlantic Owls – Game summary

| Quarter | 1 | 2 | 3 | 4 | Total |
|---|---|---|---|---|---|
| Golden Panthers | 0 | 2 | 6 | 13 | 21 |
| Owls | 7 | 14 | 3 | 7 | 31 |

at Pro Player Stadium, Miami Gardens, Florida

- Date: November 23
- Game time: 3:00 p.m. EST
- Game weather: Sunny and mild, 73 °F (23 °C)
- Game attendance: 10,224
- Referee: A. Riveron
- Box score

| Statistics | FIU | FAU |
|---|---|---|
| First downs | | |
| Total yards | | |
| Rushing yards | | |
| Passing yards | | |
| Turnovers | | |
| Time of possession | | |

| Team | Category | Player | Statistics |
|---|---|---|---|
| FIU | Passing | | |
| FIU | Rushing | | |
| FIU | Receiving | | |
| Florida Atlantic | Passing | | |
| Florida Atlantic | Rushing | | |
| Florida Atlantic | Receiving | | |

== Roster ==
2002 FIU Golden Panthers football team roster
Players
Coaches
Offense

| Pos. | # | Name | Class |
|---|---|---|---|
| WR | 2 | Everett Mitchell | Fr |
| RB | 4 | Rashod Smith | So |
| RB | 6 | Tori Robinson | Fr |
| WR | 9 | Harold Leath | So |
| QB | 10 | David Tabor | Fr |
| QB | 13 | Jamie Burke | Fr |
| WR | 15 | Titorian Freeman | Fr |
| QB | 16 | Josh Padrick | Fr |
| WR | 17 | Rod Baldwin | Fr |
| RB | 26 | Bill Grant | Fr |
| FB | 32 | Adam Radno | Fr |
| RB | 34 | Aston Wilson | So |
| RB | 35 | O. J. Price | Jr |
| RB | 36 | Diamos Demerritt | Fr |
| RB | 38 | Jerrid Lundstedt | Jr |
| RB | 44 | Adam Gorman | Fr |
| OL | 50 | Ed Wenger | Fr |
| OL | 61 | Ronny Silva | Fr |
| OL | 62 | Carlos Ruiz | So |
| OL | 63 | Patrick Lewin | Fr |
| OL | 66 | Patrick Mullen | Fr |
| OL | 69 | Larry Leon | Fr |
| OL | 70 | Glen Fox | Fr |
| OL | 71 | Ali Samara | Fr |
| OL | 72 | John Shanahan | Fr |
| OL | 73 | Josh Gravitt | Fr |
| C | 75 | Victor Cernius | Fr |
| OL | 76 | Tim Dierks | Fr |
| OL | 78 | Danny O'Neal | Fr |
| OL | 79 | Matt Mathews | Fr |
| WR | 80 | Andre Rollins | Fr |
| TE | 81 | Joe Struyf | Fr |
| WR | 82 | Ernesto Guevara | Jr |
| WR | 83 | Julius Eppinger | Fr |
| WR | 84 | Dan Landrau | Fr |
| TE | 85 | Edwin Pierre | Fr |
| WR | 86 | Cory McKinney | Fr |
| WR | 87 | Lagrant Perry | Fr |
| TE | 88 | Dannon Monroe | So |
| WR | 89 | Lenorris Hester | Fr |
| TE | 90 | Ed Leverenz | Fr |

Defense

| Pos. | # | Name | Class |
|---|---|---|---|
| DB | 1 | Randy Arnold | Fr |
| DB | 5 | Gerrod Bodie | Fr |
| DB | 8 | Greg Moss | So |
| LB | 11 | Jermell Weaver | Jr |
| DB | 18 | Gentry Jackson | Fr |
| DB | 21 | Nick Turnbull | Fr |
| DB | 22 | Kris Thomas | Fr |
| LB | 24 | T. J. Singletary | Fr |
| DB | 25 | Travis Brown | Fr |
| DB | 27 | Kevin Timothee | So |
| DB | 28 | Everett Baker | Fr |
| DB | 29 | Terran Bell | Fr |
| DB | 31 | John Haritan | Fr |
| DB | 37 | Matt Castillo | Fr |
| DB | 42 | James Knapp | Fr |
| LB | 43 | Lance Preston | Fr |
| LB | 45 | Kyle Salas | Fr |
| LB | 46 | James Black | Fr |
| LB | 48 | Geurby Mertil | Jr |
| LB | 49 | Marquis Manuel | Fr |
| LB | 52 | John Kelly | Fr |
| LB | 53 | Jonathan Sturrup | Fr |
| LB | 54 | Ethan Cherasia | Fr |
| LB | 55 | Shaun Dudney | Fr |
| LB | 56 | Dane Ireson | Fr |
| DL | 58 | Terrence Allen | Fr |
| DL | 59 | George Gonzalez | Fr |
| DL | 64 | Brandon Higdon | Fr |
| DL | 77 | Nick Carreño | Fr |
| DE | 91 | Grant Moule | Fr |
| DL | 92 | Josh Alexander | Fr |
| DE | 93 | Daunte Foster | So |
| DL | 97 | Chris Horne | Fr |
| DL | 98 | Ira Turner | So |
| DE | 99 | Payton Williams | Fr |

Special teams

| Pos. | # | Name | Class |
|---|---|---|---|
| P | 7 | Doug Jones | So |
| K | 14 | Adam Moss | Fr |

Head coach

- Don Strock

Coordinators/assistant coaches

- Greg Briner
  Offensive coordinator/Quarterbacks

Legend

- (C) Team captain
- (S) Suspended
- (I) Ineligible
- Injured
- Redshirt

Roster
Last update: September 2, 2024
