= Antwan Barnes =

American football player (born 1984)

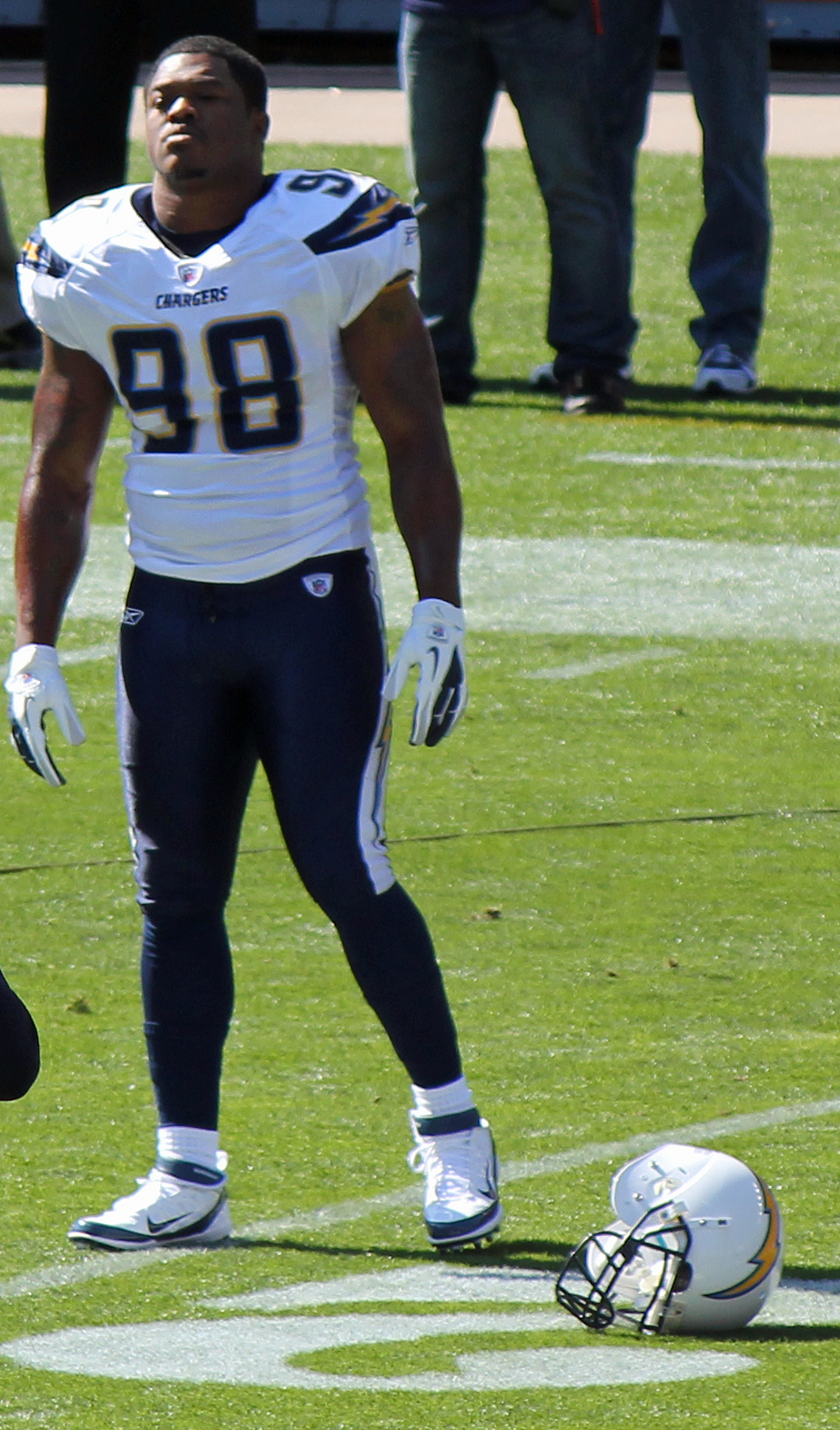
- Barnes with the San Diego Chargers in 2011

No. 50, 51, 98, 95
- Position: Linebacker

Personal information
- Born: October 19, 1984 (age 42); Miami, Florida, U.S.
- Listed height: 6 ft 1 in (1.85 m)
- Listed weight: 251 lb (114 kg)

Career information
- High school: Miami Norland (Miami Gardens, Florida)
- College: FIU
- NFL draft: 2007: 4th round, 134th overall pick

Career history
- Baltimore Ravens (2007–2009); Philadelphia Eagles (2010); San Diego Chargers (2010–2012); New York Jets (2013–2014)

Awards and highlights
- 2× First-team All-Sun Belt (2005, 2006)

Career NFL statistics
- Total tackles: 121
- Sacks: 25.5
- Forced fumbles: 5
- Fumble recoveries: 2
- Interceptions: 1
- Stats at Pro Football Reference

Antwan Edward Barnes (born October 19, 1984) is an American former professional football player who was a linebacker in the National Football League (NFL). He was selected by the Baltimore Ravens in the fourth round of the 2007 NFL draft. He played college football for the FIU Panthers. Barnes also played for the Philadelphia Eagles, San Diego Chargers, and New York Jets.

== College career ==
After graduating from Miami Norland High School, Barnes played college football at Florida International University in Miami, Florida, where he was a 2006 All-Sun Belt Conference selection and the school's all-time sacks leader with 21.5. On April 29, 2007, he became the first player in FIU history to be drafted by an NFL team when he was selected in the fourth round with the 134th overall pick by the Baltimore Ravens.

== Professional career ==
=== Baltimore Ravens ===
At the 2007 NFL Scouting Combine, Barnes ran a 4.43 second 40 yard dash, and put up 31 reps on the bench press. Barnes was a promising rookie in 2007, notching 2 sacks, 1 forced fumble, and 10 solo tackles. During a 2007 preseason game, Barnes delivered a blind side hit on Philadelphia Eagles punter Sav Rocca, knocking off his helmet. Even though officials did not penalize Barnes during the game, the league fined him $12,500 for the hit. In 2008, on a roster deep with linebackers, he made a name for himself as a stand out special teams player, also making his first post-season appearance. In 2009, Barnes started the year with his first career interception (against the San Diego Chargers, his future team), but then saw no action for several games. The team finally started using him late in the season, with the defense having struggled with its pass rush, and he came in and notched 3 sacks and 10 solo tackles, as well as a forced fumble.

=== Philadelphia Eagles ===
Barnes was traded to the Philadelphia Eagles in exchange for a 2011 seventh-round draft pick on September 4, 2010. He was released on October 9, after being sparsely used and posting only three tackles.

=== San Diego Chargers ===
Barnes was signed by the San Diego Chargers on October 12, 2010. He made an immediate impact, notching two sacks on Tom Brady in a game against the New England Patriots. As a backup pass-rush specialist, he ended the season in San Diego with 4.5 sacks and 15 tackles. On July 27, 2011, the Chargers re-signed Barnes to a two-year contract.

In the 2011 season, he established himself as one of the top pass rushers on the Chargers team, starting 5 games, and notching 41 tackles, 11 sacks, and 2 forced fumbles. His best career game came against his former team, the Baltimore Ravens, on a prime-time December 18 game in San Diego, where he garnered 4 sacks against quarterback Joe Flacco, his former teammate, along with 6 total tackles.

=== New York Jets ===
Barnes signed a two-year contract with the New York Jets on March 18, 2013. Barnes was placed on injured reserve on October 9, 2013, after suffering a season-ending knee injury. After spending the first six weeks of 2014 on the physically unable to perform list, Barnes was activated on October 15, 2014. He was released on December 1, 2014.

== NFL career statistics ==
Legend
**Bold**	Career high

=== Regular season ===
Year	Team	Games		Tackles					Interceptions					Fumbles			
Year	Team	GP	GS	Cmb	Solo	Ast	Sck	TFL	Int	Yds	TD	Lng	PD	FF	FR	Yds	TD
2007	BAL	14	0	10	10	0	2.0	3	0	0	0	0	0	1	0	0	0
2008	BAL	13	0	14	14	0	0.0	2	0	0	0	0	0	0	0	0	0
2009	BAL	11	0	13	13	0	3.0	3	**1**	**4**	0	**4**	**2**	1	0	0	0
2010	PHI	2	0	3	3	0	0.0	0	0	0	0	0	0	0	0	0	0
2010	SDG	11	0	22	17	5	4.5	5	0	0	0	0	1	0	0	0	0
2011	SDG	**16**	**5**	**41**	**34**	**7**	**11.0**	**6**	0	0	0	0	1	**2**	0	0	0
2012	SDG	11	0	9	7	2	3.0	4	0	0	0	0	0	1	**2**	**1**	0
2013	NYJ	5	0	3	2	1	2.0	2	0	0	0	0	0	0	0	0	0
2014	NYJ	5	0	6	5	1	0.0	0	0	0	0	0	0	0	0	0	0
		88	5	121	105	16	25.5	25	1	4	0	4	4	5	2	1	0

=== Playoffs ===
Year	Team	Games		Tackles					Interceptions					Fumbles			
Year	Team	GP	GS	Cmb	Solo	Ast	Sck	TFL	Int	Yds	TD	Lng	PD	FF	FR	Yds	TD
2009	BAL	**2**	0	**1**	**1**	0	0.0	0	0	0	0	0	0	**1**	0	0	0
		2	0	1	1	0	0.0	0	0	0	0	0	0	1	0	0	0
