= 2023 FIU Panthers football team =

American college football season

2023 FIU Panthers football
- Conference: Conference USA
- Record: 4–8 (1–7 C-USA)
- Head coach: Mike MacIntyre (2nd season)
- Offensive coordinator: David Yost (2nd season)
- Offensive scheme: Spread
- Defensive coordinator: Jovan Dewitt (2nd season)
- Base defense: Multiple 3–4
- Home stadium: Riccardo Silva Stadium

2023 Conference USA football standings
	Conf.			Overall
Team	W		L	W		L
No. 25 Liberty y$	8	–	0	13	–	1
New Mexico State y	7	–	1	10	–	5
Jacksonville State*	6	–	2	9	–	4
Western Kentucky	5	–	3	8	–	5
Middle Tennessee	3	–	5	4	–	8
UTEP	2	–	6	3	–	9
Sam Houston*	2	–	6	3	–	9
Louisiana Tech	2	–	6	3	–	9
FIU	1	–	7	4	–	8
Championship: Liberty 49, New Mexico State 35
$ – Conference champion; y – Championship game participant; * – Ineligible for postseason play due to FCS-to-FBS transition rules; Rankings from AP Poll

The 2023 FIU Panthers football team represented Florida International University (FIU) as a member of Conference USA (C-USA) during the 2023 NCAA Division I FBS football season. The Panthers were led by second-year head coach Mike MacIntyre and played home games at Riccardo Silva Stadium in Miami, Florida. The Panthers drew an average home attendance of 15,290 in 2023.

== Preseason ==
=== Conference USA media poll ===
Conference USA media poll
Predicted finish	Team	Votes (1st place)
1	Western Kentucky	(18)
2	Liberty	(4)
3	Middle Tennessee	
4	Louisiana Tech	
5	New Mexico State	
6	UTEP	
7	Jacksonville State	
T8	FIU	
T8	Sam Houston	

== Schedule ==
FIU and Conference USA announced the Panthers' schedule on January 10, 2023.

Date	Time	Opponent	Site	TV	Result	Attendance
August 26	9:00 p.m.	at Louisiana Tech	Joe Aillet Stadium; Ruston, LA	CBSSN	L 17–22	16,299
September 2	6:30 p.m.	Maine*	Riccardo Silva Stadium; Westchester, FL	ESPN+	W 14–12	16,878
September 9	6:30 p.m.	North Texas*	Riccardo Silva Stadium; Westchester, FL	ESPN+	W 46–39	15,754
September 16	3:30 p.m.	at UConn*	Rentschler Field; East Hartford, CT	CBSSN	W 24–17	20,405
September 23	6:30 p.m.	Liberty	Riccardo Silva Stadium; Westchester, FL	ESPN+	L 6–38	17,437
October 4	9:00 p.m.	at New Mexico State	Aggie Memorial Stadium; Las Cruces, NM	CBSSN	L 17–34	11,540
October 11	7:30 p.m.	UTEP	Riccardo Silva Stadium; Westchester, FL	ESPN2	L 14–27	14,872
October 18	7:00 p.m.	at Sam Houston	Bowers Stadium; Huntsville, TX	CBSSN	W 33–27 ^{2OT}	7,543
October 25	7:00 p.m.	Jacksonville State	Riccardo Silva Stadium; Westchester, FL	CBSSN	L 16–41	14,074
November 11	3:30 p.m.	at Middle Tennessee	Johnny "Red" Floyd Stadium; Murfreesboro, TN	ESPN+	L 6–40	11,111
November 18	7:00 p.m.	at Arkansas*	Donald W. Reynolds Razorback Stadium; Fayetteville, AR	ESPNU	L 20–44	61,442
November 25	3:00 p.m.	Western Kentucky	Riccardo Silva Stadium; Westchester, FL	ESPN+	L 28–41	12,724
*Non-conference game; All times are in Eastern time

== Game summaries ==
=== at Louisiana Tech (Week 0) ===
FIU Panthers (0-0) at Louisiana Tech Bulldogs (0-0) – Game Summary

Quarter	1	2	3	4	Total
Panthers	14	3	0	0	17
Bulldogs	0	13	0	9	22

at Joe Aillet Stadium • Ruston, Louisiana

- Date: August 26
- Game time: 9:00 p.m. EST/6:00 p.m. PST
- Game attendance: 16,299
- TV announcers (CBSSN): TBD

Game information

First quarter

Second quarter

Third quarter

Fourth quarter

Statistics	Florida International	Louisiana Tech
First downs	8	27
Plays–yards	182	450
Rushes–yards	178	117
Passing yards	4	333
Passing: comp–att–int	5–14–1	34–44–1
Time of possession	21:42	38:13

Team	Category	Player	Statistics
Florida International	Passing	Grayson James	5/14, 4 yards, INT
Florida International	Rushing	Shomari Lawrence	15 carries, 139 yards, TD
Florida International	Receiving	Josiah Miamen	1 reception, 4 yards
Louisiana Tech	Passing	Hank Bachmeier	34/44, 333 yards, TD, INT
Louisiana Tech	Rushing	Charvis Thornton	8 carries, 51 yards
Louisiana Tech	Receiving	Smoke Harris	11 receptions, 155 yards, TD

=== vs Maine (FCS) ===
Maine Black Bears (FCS) (0-0) at FIU Panthers (0-1) – Game Summary

Quarter	1	2	3	4	Total
Black Bears (FCS)	3	3	6	0	12
Panthers	7	7	0	0	14

at Riccardo Silva Stadium • Westchester, Florida

- Date: September 2nd
- Game time: 6:30 p.m. EST/3:30 p.m. PST
- Game weather: Cloudy, 86 °F (30 °C), Wind: NE 13mph
- Game attendance: 16,878
- Referee: Joe Lehring
- TV announcers (ESPN+): TBD

Game information

First quarter

Second quarter

Third quarter

Fourth quarter

Statistics	Maine (FCS)	Florida International
First downs	27	13
Plays–yards	85–378	54–305
Rushes–yards	41–165	24–13
Passing yards	213	292
Passing: comp–att–int	21–44–0	15–30–1
Time of possession	39:05	20:00

Team	Category	Player	Statistics
Maine (FCS)	Passing	Derek Robertson	21/43, 213 yards
Maine (FCS)	Rushing	Tristen Kenan	24 rushes, 110 yards, TD
Maine (FCS)	Receiving	Montigo Moss	3 receptions, 50 yards
Florida International	Passing	Keyone Jenkins	15/30, 292 yards, 2 TD, INT
Florida International	Rushing	Shomari Lawrence	7 rushes, 26 yards
Florida International	Receiving	Kris Mitchell	9 receptions, 201 yards, 2 TD

=== vs North Texas ===
North Texas Mean Green (0-1) at FIU Panthers (1-1) – Game Summary

Quarter	1	2	3	4	Total
Mean Green	10	10	7	12	39
Panthers	7	10	21	8	46

at Riccardo Silva Stadium • Westchester, Florida

- Date: September 9th
- Game time: 6:30 p.m. EST/3:30 p.m. PST
- Game attendance: 15,754
- TV announcers (ESPN+): TBD

Game information

First quarter

Second quarter

Third quarter

Fourth quarter

Statistics	North Texas	Florida International
First downs		
Plays–yards		
Rushes–yards		
Passing yards		
Passing: comp–att–int		
Time of possession		

Team	Category	Player	Statistics
North Texas	Passing		
North Texas	Rushing		
North Texas	Receiving		
Florida International	Passing		
Florida International	Rushing		
Florida International	Receiving		

=== at UConn ===
FIU Panthers (2-1) at UConn Huskies (0-2) – Game Summary

Quarter	1	2	3	4	Total
Panthers	7	17	0	0	24
Huskies	3	0	7	7	17

at Rentschler Field • East Hartford, Connecticut

- Date: September 16th
- Game time: 3:30 p.m. EST/12:30 p.m. PST
- Game weather: Cloudy, 72 °F (22 °C), Wind: NW 14 MPH
- Game attendance: 20,405
- Referee: Art Brown
- TV announcers (CBSSN): Dave Ryan (play-by-play), Christian Fauria (color analyst), and Keiana Martin (sideline)

Game information

First quarter

- FIU – Jenkins, Keyone 1 yd run (Gabriel, Chase kick), 12:27. Panthers 7–0. Drive: 6 plays, 75 yards, TOP 02:33
- UCONN – McFadden, Joe 26 yd field goal, 5:49. Panthers 7–3. Drive: 13 plays, 71 yards, TOP 06:32

Second quarter

- FIU – Gabriel, Chase 27 yd field goal, 14:58. Panthers 10–3. Drive: 5 plays, 54 yards, TOP 01:35
- FIU – Bracey, Jalen 45 yd pass from Jenkins, Keyone (Gabriel, Chase kick), 11:46. Panthers 17–3. Drive: 3 plays, 44 yards, TOP 01:37
- FIU – Mitchell, Kris 64 yd pass from Jenkins, Keyone (Gabriel, Chase kick), 0:47. Panthers 24–3. Drive: 3 plays, 80 yards, TOP 00:25

Third quarter

- UCONN – Stafford, Jelani 1 yd run (McFadden, Joe kick), 11:32. Panthers 24–10. Drive: 8 plays, 82 yards, TOP 03:23

Fourth quarter

- UCONN – Houston, Devontae 37 yd pass from Roberson, Ta'Quan (McFadden, Joe kick), 14:04. Panthers 24–17. Drive: 4 plays, 56 yards, TOP 01:13

Statistics	Florida International	UConn
First downs	16	20
Plays–yards	364	343
Rushes–yards	80	173
Passing yards	284	170
Passing: comp–att–int	15–27–0	15–32–0
Time of possession	27:42	32:18

Team	Category	Player	Statistics
Florida International	Passing	Keyone Jenkins	15/27, 284 yards, 2 TD
Florida International	Rushing	Shomari Lawrence	9 carries, 37 yards
Florida International	Receiving	Jalen Bracey	5 receptions, 90 yards, TD
UConn	Passing	Ta'Quan Roberson	15/32, 170 yards, TD
UConn	Rushing	Devontae Houston	19 carries, 126 yards
UConn	Receiving	Brett Buckman	5 receptions, 62 yards

=== vs Liberty ===
Liberty Flames (3-0) at FIU Panthers (3-1) – Game Summary

Quarter	1	2	3	4	Total
Flames	14	10	14	0	38
Panthers	6	0	0	0	6

at Riccardo Silva Stadium • Westcester, Florida

- Date: September 23rd
- Game time: 6:30 p.m. EST/3:30 p.m. PST
- Game weather: 82 °F (28 °C); Cloudy
- Game attendance: 17,437
- Referee: Garrett Dickerson
- TV announcers (ESPN+): AJ Ricketts and Jonathan Zipper

Game information

First quarter

- (11:21) LIB – Bentley Hanshaw 9-yard pass from Kaidon Salter (Nick Brown kick) (Drive: 8 plays, 75 yards, 3:35; Liberty 7-0)
- (9:04) LIB – Treon Sibley 68-yard pass from Kaidon Salter (Nick Brown kick) (Drive: 3 plays, 72 yards, :54; Liberty 14-0)
- (1:40) FIU – Keyone Jenkins 1-yard run (kick failed) (Drive: 10 plays, 94 yards, 4:50; Liberty 14-6)

Second quarter

- (2:56) LIB – Billy Lucas 18-yard run (Nick Brown kick) (Drive: 6 plays, 62 yards, 2:52; Liberty 21-6)
- (1:50) LIB – Nick Brown 41-yard field goal (Drive: 4 plays, 3 yards, :48; Liberty 24-6)

Third quarter

- (10:09) LIB – Kaidon Salter 2-yard run (Nick Brown kick) (Drive: 6 plays, 46 yards, 3:14; Liberty 31-6)
- (3:48) LIB – Kaidon Salter 1-yard run (Nick Brown kick) (Drive: 7 plays, 65 yards, 4:52; Liberty 38-6)

Statistics	LIB	FIU
First downs	22	11
Plays–yards	65-520	57-211
Rushes–yards	44-364	33-64
Passing yards	156	147
Passing: comp–att–int	11-21-1	11-24-1
Time of possession	33:09	26:51

Team	Category	Player	Statistics
Liberty	Passing	Kaidon Salter	11/21, 156 yards, 2TD, 1INT
Liberty	Rushing	Quinton Cooley, Billy Lucas	12 carries, 102 yards / 11 carries, 102 yards, 1TD
Liberty	Receiving	Treon Sibley	2 receptions, 83 yards, 1TD
Florida International	Passing	Keyone Jenkins	9/21, 133 yards, 1INT
Florida International	Rushing	Kejon Owens	11 carries, 42 yards
Florida International	Receiving	Kris Mitchell	3 receptions, 89 yards

=== at New Mexico State ===
FIU Panthers (3-2) at New Mexico State Aggies (2-3) – Game Summary

Quarter	1	2	3	4	Total
Panthers	7	7	3	0	17
Aggies	7	7	3	17	34

at Aggie Memorial Stadium • Las Cruces, New Mexico

- Date: October 4th
- Game time: 9:00 p.m. EST/6:00 p.m. PST
- Game weather: Cloudy, 79 °F (26 °C)
- Game attendance: 11,540
- Referee: Garrett Dickerson
- TV announcers (CBSSN): Jordan Kent and Donte Whitner

Game information

First quarter

- (7:18) NMSU – Chris Bellamy 11-yard pass from Diego Pavia (Ethan Albertson kick), 7:18. Aggies 7–0. Drive: 11 plays, 76 yards, 6:34.
- (4:41) FIU – Keyone Jenkins 6-yard run (Chase Gabriel kick), 4:41. Tied 7–7. Drive: 7 plays, 75 yards, 2:37.

Second quarter

- (8:33) NMSU – Jordin Parker 49-yard pass from Diego Pavia (Ethan Albertson kick), 8:33. Aggies 14–7. Drive: 5 plays, 78 yards, 2:30.
- (1:26) FIU – Shomari Lawrence 6-yard run (Chase Gabriel kick), 1:26. Tied 14–14. Drive: 9 plays, 81 yards, 3:24.

Third quarter

- (7:44) NMSU – Ethan Albertson 23-yard field goal, 7:44. Aggies 17–14. Drive: 12 plays, 70 yards, 7:16.
- (1:01) FIU – Chase Gabriel 41-yard field goal, 1:01. Tied 17–17. Drive: 12 plays, 61 yards, 6:36.

Fourth quarter

- (14:53) NMSU – Diego Pavia 43-yard run (Ethan Albertson kick), 14:53. Aggies 24–17. Drive: 3 plays, 75 yards, 1:08.
- (10:35) NMSU – Star Thomas 3-yard run (Ethan Albertson kick), 10:35. Aggies 31–17. Drive: 4 plays, 61 yards, 1:47.
- (1:12) NMSU – Ethan Albertson 28-yard field goal, 1:12. Aggies 34–17. Drive: 4 plays, 4 yards, 1:01.

Statistics	Florida International	New Mexico State
First downs	20	21
Plays–yards	64–405	62–439
Rushes–yards	29–87	31–183
Passing yards	318	256
Passing: comp–att–int	28–35–2	20–31–1
Time of possession	28:04	31:56

Team	Category	Player	Statistics
Florida International	Passing	Keyone Jenkins	25/32, 258 yards, 2 INT
Florida International	Rushing	Kejon Owens	6 carries, 51 yards
Florida International	Receiving	Kris Mitchell	8 receptions, 91 yards
New Mexico State	Passing	Diego Pavia	20/31, 256 yards, 2 TD, INT
New Mexico State	Rushing	Monte Watkins	5 carries, 89 yards
New Mexico State	Receiving	Jordin Parker	1 reception, 49 yards, TD

=== vs UTEP ===
UTEP Miners (1-5) at FIU Panthers (3-3) – Game Summary

Quarter	1	2	3	4	Total
Miners	0	0	0	0	0
Panthers	0	0	0	0	0

at Riccardo Silva Stadium • Westchester, Florida

- Date: October 11th
- Game time: 7:30 p.m. EST/4:30 p.m. PST
- Game attendance: 14,872
- TV announcers (ESPN2): TBD

Game information

First quarter

Second quarter

Third quarter

Fourth quarter

Statistics	UTEP	Florida International
First downs		
Plays–yards		
Rushes–yards		
Passing yards		
Passing: comp–att–int		
Time of possession		

Team	Category	Player	Statistics
UTEP	Passing		
UTEP	Rushing		
UTEP	Receiving		
Florida International	Passing		
Florida International	Rushing		
Florida International	Receiving		

=== at Sam Houston ===
FIU Panthers (3-4) at Sam Houston Bearkats (0-6) – Game Summary

Quarter	1	2	3	4	OT	2OT	Total
Panthers	0	0	0	0	0	0	0
Bearkates	0	0	0	0	0	0	0

at Bowers Stadium • Huntsville, Texas

- Date: October 18th
- Game time: 7:00 p.m. EST/4:00 p.m. PST
- Game attendance: 7,543
- TV announcers (CBSSN): TBD

Game information

First quarter

Second quarter

Third quarter

Fourth quarter

Overtime

Second overtime

Statistics	Florida International	Sam Houston
First downs		
Plays–yards		
Rushes–yards		
Passing yards		
Passing: comp–att–int		
Time of possession		

Team	Category	Player	Statistics
Florida International	Passing		
Florida International	Rushing		
Florida International	Receiving		
Sam Houston	Passing		
Sam Houston	Rushing		
Sam Houston	Receiving		

=== vs Jacksonville State ===
Jacksonville State Gamecocks (6-2) at FIU Panthers (4-4) – Game Summary

Quarter	1	2	3	4	Total
Gamecocks	0	0	0	0	0
Panthers	0	0	0	0	0

at Riccardo Silva Stadium • Westchester, Florida

- Date: October 25th
- Game time: 7:00 p.m. EST/4:00 p.m. PST
- Game attendance: 14,074
- TV announcers (CBSSN): TBD

Game information

First quarter

Second quarter

Third quarter

Fourth quarter

Statistics	Jacksonville State	Florida International
First downs		
Plays–yards		
Rushes–yards		
Passing yards		
Passing: comp–att–int		
Time of possession		

Team	Category	Player	Statistics
Jacksonville State	Passing		
Jacksonville State	Rushing		
Jacksonville State	Receiving		
Florida International	Passing		
Florida International	Rushing		
Florida International	Receiving		

=== at Middle Tennessee ===
FIU Panthers (4-5) at Middle Tennessee Blue Raiders (2-7) – Game Summary

Quarter	1	2	3	4	Total
Panthers	0	0	0	0	0
Blue Raiders	0	0	0	0	0

at Johnny "Red" Floyd Stadium • Murfreesboro, Tennessee

- Date: November 11th
- Game time: 3:30 p.m. EST/12:30 p.m. PST
- Game attendance: 11,111
- TV announcers (ESPN+): TBD

Game information

First quarter

Second quarter

Third quarter

Fourth quarter

Statistics	Florida International	Middle Tennessee
First downs		
Plays–yards		
Rushes–yards		
Passing yards		
Passing: comp–att–int		
Time of possession		

Team	Category	Player	Statistics
Florida International	Passing		
Florida International	Rushing		
Florida International	Receiving		
Middle Tennessee	Passing		
Middle Tennessee	Rushing		
Middle Tennessee	Receiving		

=== at Arkansas ===
FIU Panthers (4-6) at Arkansas Razorbacks (3-7) – Game Summary

Quarter	1	2	3	4	Total
Panthers	0	0	0	0	0
Razorbacks	0	0	0	0	0

at Donald W. Reynolds Razorback Stadium • Fayetteville, Arkansas

- Date: November 18th
- Game time: 7:30 p.m. EST/4:30 p.m. PST
- Game attendance: 61,442
- TV announcers (ESPNU): TBD

Game information

First quarter

Second quarter

Third quarter

Fourth quarter

Statistics	Florida International	Arkansas
First downs		
Plays–yards		
Rushes–yards		
Passing yards		
Passing: comp–att–int		
Time of possession		

Team	Category	Player	Statistics
Florida International	Passing		
Florida International	Rushing		
Florida International	Receiving		
Arkansas	Passing		
Arkansas	Rushing		
Arkansas	Receiving		

=== vs Western Kentucky ===
Western Kentucky Hilltoppers (6-5) at FIU Panthers (4-7) – Game Summary

Quarter	1	2	3	4	Total
Hilltoppers	0	0	0	0	0
Panthers	0	0	0	0	0

at Riccardo Silva Stadium • Westchester, Florida

- Date: November 25th
- Game time: 3:00 p.m. EST/12:00 p.m. PST
- Game attendance: 12,724
- TV announcers (ESPN+): TBD

Game information

First quarter

Second quarter

Third quarter

Fourth quarter

Statistics	Western Kentucky	Florida International
First downs		
Plays–yards		
Rushes–yards		
Passing yards		
Passing: comp–att–int		
Time of possession		

Team	Category	Player	Statistics
Western Kentucky	Passing		
Western Kentucky	Rushing		
Western Kentucky	Receiving		
Florida International	Passing		
Florida International	Rushing		
Florida International	Receiving		
