= 2007 FIU Golden Panthers football team =

American college football season

2007 FIU Golden Panthers football
- Conference: Sun Belt Conference
- Record: 1–11 (1–6 Sun Belt)
- Head coach: Mario Cristobal (1st season)
- Offensive coordinator: James Coley (1st season)
- Offensive scheme: Spread
- Defensive coordinator: Phil Galiano (1st season)
- Base defense: 4–3
- Home stadium: Miami Orange Bowl

2007 Sun Belt Conference football standings
	Conf.			Overall
Team	W		L	W		L
Florida Atlantic +	6	–	1	8	–	5
Troy +	6	–	1	8	–	4
Middle Tennessee	4	–	3	5	–	7
Louisiana–Monroe	4	–	3	6	–	6
Arkansas State	3	–	4	5	–	7
Louisiana–Lafayette	3	–	4	3	–	9
FIU	1	–	6	1	–	11
North Texas	1	–	6	2	–	10
+ – Conference co-champions

The 2007 FIU Golden Panthers football team represented Florida International University (FIU) as a member of the Sun Belt Conference during the 2007 NCAA Division I FBS football season. Led by first-year head coach Mario Cristobal, the Panthers compiled an overall record of 1–11 with a mark of 1–6 in conference play, tying for seventh place at the bottom of the Sun Belt standings. The team played home games at the Miami Orange Bowl while FIU Stadium, the Golden Panthers' normal home field, underwent expansion. Cristobal replaced FIU's first head coach, Don Strock, who resigned after an 0–12 season marred by the FIU–Miami football brawl.

== Schedule ==
Date	Time	Opponent	Site	TV	Result	Attendance
September 1	12:00 pm	at No. 17 Penn State*	Beaver Stadium; University Park, PA	BTN	L 0–59	107,678
September 8	7:00 pm	Maryland*	Miami Orange Bowl; Miami, FL	ESPN360	L 10–26	12,201
September 15	3:30 pm	at Miami*	Miami Orange Bowl; Miami, FL	ESPNU	L 9–23	40,915
September 22	7:00 pm	at Kansas*	Memorial Stadium; Lawrence, KS		L 3–55	42,134
September 29	6:00 pm	at Middle Tennessee	Johnny "Red" Floyd Stadium; Murfreesboro, TN		L 6–47	15,605
October 6	7:00 pm	Troy	Miami Orange Bowl; Miami, FL		L 16–34	5,723
October 20	7:00 pm	at Louisiana–Monroe	Malone Stadium; Monroe, LA		L 14–28	8,814
October 27	2:00 pm	at Arkansas*	Donald W. Reynolds Razorback Stadium; Fayetteville, AR		L 10–58	60,750
November 3	3:00 pm	at Arkansas State	ASU Stadium; Jonesboro, AR	ESPN Plus	L 24–27	12,326
November 17	6:00 pm	Louisiana–Lafayette	Miami Orange Bowl; Miami, FL		L 28–38	5,734†
November 24	7:00 pm	Florida Atlantic	Miami Orange Bowl; Miami, FL (Shula Bowl)	ESPN Plus	L 23–55	6,122
December 1	6:00 pm	North Texas	Miami Orange Bowl; Miami, FL		W 38–19	10,129
*Non-conference game; Rankings from AP Poll released prior to the game; All times are in Eastern time
