= 2009 FIU Golden Panthers football team =

American college football season

2009 FIU Golden Panthers football
- Conference: Sun Belt Conference
- Record: 3–9 (3–5 Sun Belt)
- Head coach: Mario Cristobal (3rd season)
- Offensive coordinator: Bill Legg (2nd season)
- Offensive scheme: Spread
- Defensive coordinator: Phil Galiano (3rd season)
- Base defense: 4–3
- Home stadium: FIU Stadium

2009 Sun Belt Conference football standings
	Conf.			Overall
Team	W		L	W		L
Troy $	8	–	0	9	–	4
Middle Tennessee	7	–	1	10	–	3
Louisiana–Monroe	5	–	3	6	–	6
Florida Atlantic	5	–	3	5	–	7
Louisiana–Lafayette	4	–	4	6	–	6
Arkansas State	3	–	5	4	–	8
FIU	3	–	5	3	–	9
North Texas	1	–	7	2	–	10
Western Kentucky	0	–	8	0	–	12
$ – Conference champion

The 2009 FIU Golden Panthers football team represented Florida International University (FIU) as a member of the Sun Belt Conference during the 2009 NCAA Division I FBS football season. Led by third-year head coach Mario Cristobal, the Panthers compiled an overall record of 3–9 with a mark of 3–5 in conference play, tying for sixth place in the Sun Belt. The team played home game at FIU Stadium in Miami.

== Schedule ==
Date	Time	Opponent	Site	TV	Result	Attendance	Source
September 12	7:00 p.m.	at No. 4 Alabama*	Bryant–Denny Stadium; Tuscaloosa, AL	ESPN360	L 14–40	92,012	
September 19	5:00 p.m.	at Rutgers*	Rutgers Stadium; Piscataway, NJ	ESPN360	L 15–23	45,273	
September 26	7:00 p.m.	Toledo*	FIU Stadium; Miami, FL		L 31–41	11,047	
October 3	3:30 p.m.	at Louisiana–Monroe	Malone Stadium; Monroe, LA		L 35–48	17,610	
October 10	7:00 p.m.	at Western Kentucky	Houchens Industries–L. T. Smith Stadium; Bowling Green, KY		W 37–20	13,574	
October 17	7:00 p.m.	Troy	FIU Stadium; Miami, FL		L 33–42	10,142	
October 24	7:00 p.m.	at Arkansas State	ASU Stadium; Jonesboro, AR		L 10–27	18,779	
October 31	12:00 p.m.	Louisiana–Lafayette	FIU Stadium; Miami, FL		W 20–17 ^{OT}	8,593	
November 7	4:30 p.m.	at Middle Tennessee	Johnny "Red" Floyd Stadium; Murfreesboro, TN		L 21–48	17,808	
November 14	7:00 p.m.	North Texas	FIU Stadium; Miami, FL		W 35–28	11,128	
November 21	12:30 p.m.	at No. 1 Florida*	Ben Hill Griffin Stadium; Gainesville, FL		L 3–62	90,473	
December 5	7:00 p.m.	Florida Atlantic	FIU Stadium; Miami, FL (Shula Bowl)	CSS	L 21–28	10,108	
*Non-conference game; Rankings from AP Poll released prior to the game; All times are in Eastern time

== Game summaries ==
=== Alabama ===
	1	2	3	4	Total
FIU	7	7	0	0	14
Alabama	10	10	6	14	40

=== Rutgers ===
	1	2	3	4	Total
FIU	0	0	0	15	15
Rutgers	3	10	0	10	23

=== Toledo ===
	1	2	3	4	Total
Toledo	14	3	7	17	41
FIU	0	3	14	14	31

=== Louisiana–Monroe ===
	1	2	3	4	Total
FIU	7	7	14	7	35
Louisiana–Monroe	0	24	14	10	48

=== Western Kentucky ===
	1	2	3	4	Total
FIU	10	7	13	7	37
Western Kentucky	0	7	7	6	20

=== Troy ===
	1	2	3	4	Total
Troy	7	21	14	0	42
FIU	0	20	0	13	33

=== Arkansas State ===
	1	2	3	4	Total
FIU	0	0	3	7	10
Arkansas State	7	0	10	10	27

=== Louisiana–Lafayette ===
	1	2	3	4	OT	Total
Louisiana–Lafayette	7	7	0	3	0	17
FIU	7	3	0	7	3	20

=== Middle Tennessee ===
	1	2	3	4	Total
FIU	0	7	14	0	21
Middle Tennessee	17	17	0	14	48

=== North Texas ===
	1	2	3	4	Total
North Texas	14	14	0	0	28
FIU	14	0	7	14	35

=== Florida ===
	1	2	3	4	Total
FIU	0	3	0	0	3
#1 Florida	14	21	14	13	62

=== Florida Atlantic ===
	1	2	3	4	Total
FAU	7	7	0	14	28
FIU	0	7	7	7	21

== Coaching staff ==
Name	Title	Years at FIU	Alma mater
Mario Cristobal	Head Coach	2006 –	Miami
Bill Legg	Offensive Coordinator; Quarterbacks	2008 –	West Virginia
Phil Galiano	Defensive Coordinator; Linebackers	2007 –	Shippensburg
Apollo Wright	Special Teams Coordinator	2001 –	Wagner College
Mike Cassano	Assistant Head Coach; Running Backs/Recruiting	2006 –	New Hampshire
Cary Godette	Assistant Head Coach; Defensive line	2009 –	East Carolina
Greg Laffere	Assistant Head Coach; Offensive line	2005 –	Miami
Alex Mirabal	Assistant Head Coach; Tight Ends	2006 –	FIU
Frank Ponce	Assistant Head Coach; Wide Receivers	2005 –	FIU
Jeff Popovich	Assistant Head Coach; Secondary	2006 –	Miami
Roderick Moore	Strength & Conditioning Coach	–	-
Chris Siegle	Graduate Assistant Coach	2005 –	-
Dennis Smith	Graduate Assistant Coach	2006 –	Miami
