= James Morgan (gridiron football) =

American football player (born 1997)

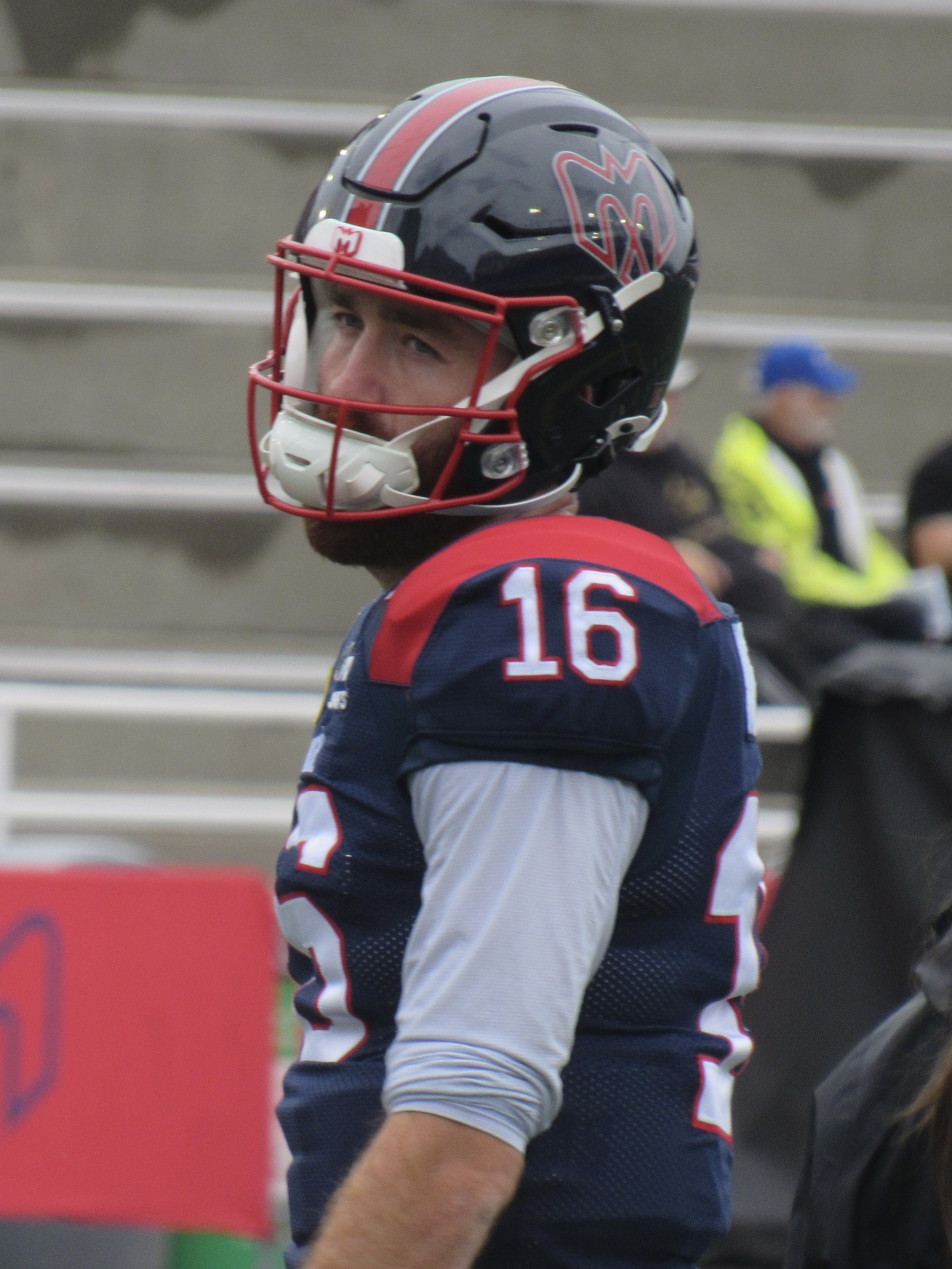
- Morgan with the Montreal Alouettes in 2025

Profile
- Position: Quarterback

Personal information
- Born: February 28, 1997 (age 29); Green Bay, Wisconsin, U.S.
- Listed height: 6 ft 4 in (1.93 m)
- Listed weight: 229 lb (104 kg)

Career information
- High school: Ashwaubenon (Ashwaubenon, Wisconsin)
- College: Bowling Green (2015–2017); FIU (2018–2019)
- NFL draft: 2020: 4th round, 125th overall pick

Career history
- New York Jets (2020); Carolina Panthers (2021)*; Pittsburgh Steelers (2021)*; New York Jets (2021)*; Indianapolis Colts (2021–2022)*; Arizona Cardinals (2022)*; Pittsburgh Maulers (2023); Montreal Alouettes (2024–2025)
- * Offseason or practice squad member only

Awards and highlights
- C–USA Newcomer of the Year (2018)

Career USFL statistics
- TD–INT: 0–3
- Passing yards: 210
- Completion percentage: 47.9
- Passer rating: 34.2
- Stats at Pro Football Reference

James Morgan (born February 28, 1997) is an American professional football quarterback. He played college football for the Bowling Green Falcons and FIU Panthers before being selected by the New York Jets in the fourth round of the 2020 NFL draft.

== College career ==
A three-star recruit from Ashwaubenon High School in suburban Green Bay, Wisconsin, Morgan chose Bowling Green for coach Dino Babers. Morgan redshirted his freshman year, and after that season, Babers left for Syracuse. After two years of new coach Mike Jinks' Air Raid offense, Morgan decided to transfer after the 2017 season, eventually landing on Florida International as his new school. Morgan emailed a transfer pitch to 20 schools, and FIU coach Bryn Renner was the only person who responded to the email. Due to Morgan finishing his prelaw degree during his three years at Bowling Green, he was eligible immediately at FIU as a graduate transfer.

After his senior season, Morgan played in the 2020 East–West Shrine Bowl, throwing a touchdown and helping the East team to victory. He also earned an invite to the 2020 NFL Combine.

== Professional career ==
Pre-draft measurables
Height	Weight	Arm length	Hand span	Wingspan	40-yard dash	10-yard split	20-yard split	20-yard shuttle	Three-cone drill	Vertical jump	Broad jump	Wonderlic
6 ft 4 in (1.93 m)	229 lb (104 kg)	33 3/8 in (0.85 m)	9 3/4 in (0.25 m)	6 ft 7 in (2.01 m)	4.89 s	1.65 s	2.87 s	4.64 s	7.51 s	29.0 in (0.74 m)	9 ft 4 in (2.84 m)	23
All values from NFL Combine

=== New York Jets (first stint) ===
Morgan was selected by the New York Jets in the fourth round with the 125th overall pick of the 2020 NFL draft. On August 31, 2021, Morgan was waived by the Jets.

=== Carolina Panthers ===
On September 2, 2021, Morgan was signed to the practice squad of the Carolina Panthers. He was released by the Panthers on November 12.

=== Pittsburgh Steelers ===
On November 15, 2021, Morgan was signed to the Pittsburgh Steelers' practice squad. He was released by the Steelers on November 23.

=== New York Jets (second stint) ===
On November 24, 2021, Morgan was signed to the Jets practice squad, but was released six days later.

=== Indianapolis Colts ===
On December 6, 2021, Morgan was signed to the Indianapolis Colts' practice squad. He signed a reserve/future contract with Indianapolis on January 10, 2022. Morgan was released by the Colts on May 23.

=== Pittsburgh Maulers (first stint) ===
Morgan signed with the Pittsburgh Maulers (USFL) of the United States Football League on September 26, 2022.

=== Arizona Cardinals ===
On December 20, 2022, the Arizona Cardinals signed Morgan to their practice squad. On January 7, 2023, Morgan was released by the Cardinals.

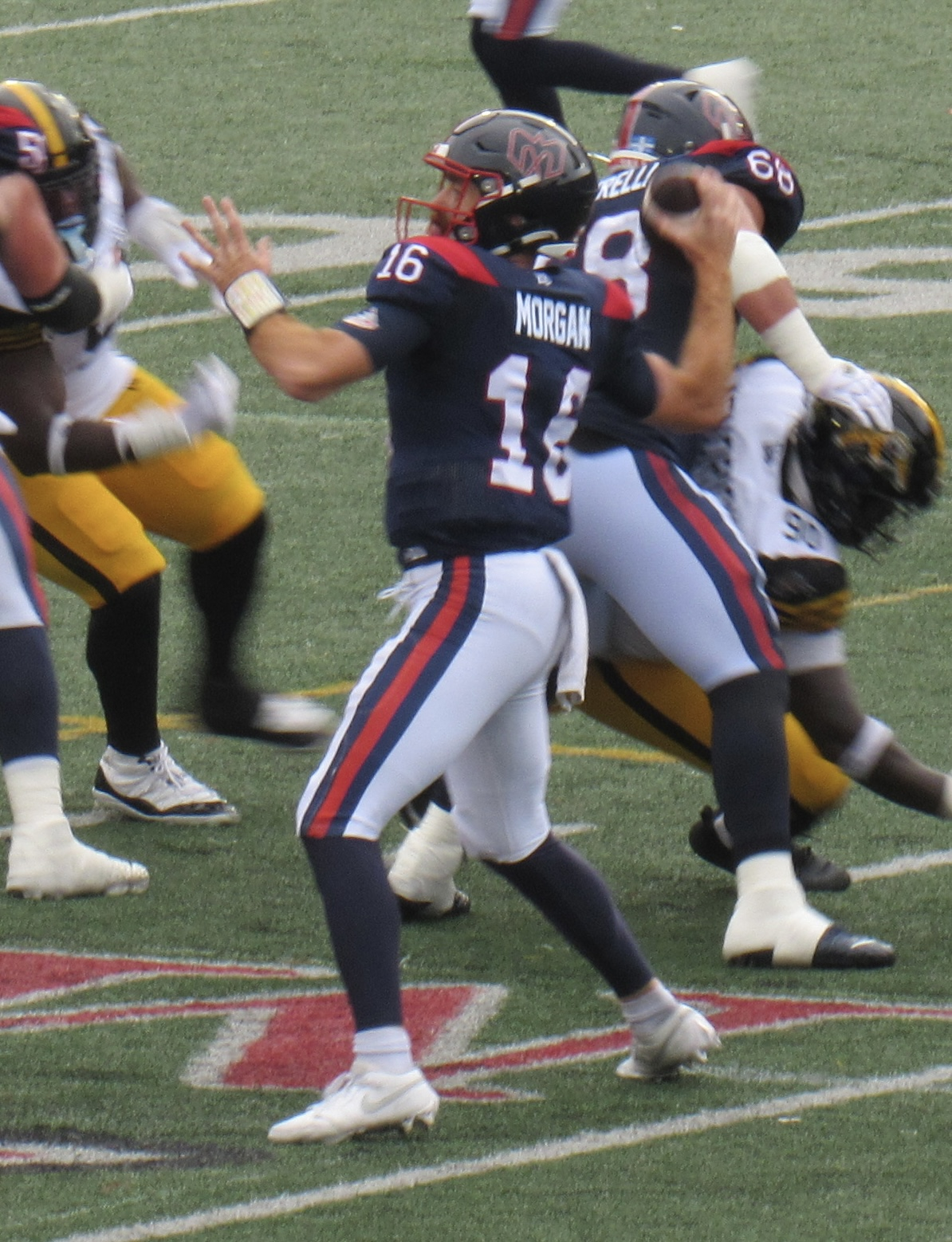
Morgan with the Alouettes in 2025

=== Pittsburgh Maulers (second stint) ===
On January 14, 2023, Morgan re-signed with the Maulers following his stint with the Cardinals. The Maulers folded when the XFL and USFL merged to create the United Football League (UFL).

=== Montreal Alouettes ===
On January 17, 2024, Morgan signed with the Montreal Alouettes of the Canadian Football League. He dressed in four games in 2024, but did not play or record any stats.

In 2025, Morgan began the year as the fourth string quarterback and was a healthy scratch, but dressed for games following an injury to the incumbent starter, Davis Alexander. After injuries to fellow quarterbacks McLeod Bethel-Thompson and Caleb Evans, Morgan saw his first regular season action in the second quarter of the team's game against the BC Lions on August 16, 2025. He finished the game having completed 20 of 33 pass attempts for 211 yards with one passing touchdown and one interception in the team's 36–18 loss. He started the next two games, the first starts of his CFL career, but had under 200 yards passing in both games as the Alouettes lost all three games that he played in. He finished the season having dressed in 10 regular season games, starting in two, as he completed 55 of 93 pass attempts for 547 yards with two touchdowns and four interceptions.

Morgan was released by the Alouettes in the following offseason on February 27, 2026. He was re-signed on May 18. Morgan was released on May 31 as part of final roster cuts.

== Career statistics ==
=== CFL ===
Year	Team	Games			Passing								Rushing			
Year	Team	GD	GS	Record	Cmp	Att	Pct	Yds	Y/A	TD	Int	Rtg	Att	Yds	Avg	TD
2024	MTL	5	0	—	DNP											
2025	MTL	10	2	0–2	55	93	59.1	547	5.9	2	4	65.1	6	17	2.1	0
Career		15	2	0–2	55	93	59.1	547	5.9	2	4	65.1	6	17	2.1	0

=== USFL ===
Year	Team	Games			Passing								Rushing			
Year	Team	GP	GS	Record	Cmp	Att	Pct	Yds	Y/A	TD	Int	Rtg	Att	Yds	Avg	TD
2023	PIT	3	2	0–2	23	48	47.9	210	4.4	0	3	34.2	5	7	1.4	0

=== College ===
Year	Team	Games			Passing								Rushing			
Year	Team	GP	GS	Record	Comp	Att	Pct	Yards	Avg	TD	Int	Rate	Att	Yards	Avg	TD
2015	Bowling Green	Redshirt (redshirt)														
2016	Bowling Green	12	7	2–5	183	326	56.1	2,082	6.4	16	15	116.8	45	-72	-1.6	0
2017	Bowling Green	7	6	1–5	96	212	45.3	1,260	5.9	9	7	102.6	26	-37	-1.4	0
2018	FIU	12	12	8–4	213	326	65.3	2,727	8.4	26	7	157.6	27	-19	-0.7	1
2019	FIU	12	12	6–6	207	357	58.0	2,560	7.2	14	5	128.4	32	-40	-1.3	2
Career		43	37	17−20	699	1,221	57.2	8,629	7.1	65	34	128.6	130	-168	-1.3	3

== Personal life ==
Morgan also played basketball and won a state championship in the 4x400 meter relay at Ashwaubenon High School. After his football career is over, Morgan plans on entering law school.
