= 2025 First Responder Bowl =

2025 First Responder Bowl may refer to one of the following college football bowl games:

- 2025 First Responder Bowl (January), featuring the North Texas Mean Green and Texas State Bobcats
- 2025 First Responder Bowl (December), featuring the FIU Panthers and UTSA Roadrunners

== See also ==
- First Responder Bowl
