= Cotton Bowl (stadium) =

Stadium in Dallas, Texas, United States

Cotton Bowl Stadium
- The House That Doak Built
- The stadium in 2019
- Interactive map of Cotton Bowl Stadium
- Former names: Fair Park Stadium (1930–1936)
- Address: 1300 Robert Cullum Blvd.
- Location: Dallas, Texas, United States
- Coordinates: 32°46′46″N 96°45′35″W
- Owner: City of Dallas
- Capacity: 92,100
- Surface: Natural grass (1930–1969, since 1994); AstroTurf (1970–1993)
- Record attendance: 96,009 (thrice)
- Public transit: Dallas Area Rapid Transit; Green Line at Fair Park

Construction
- Groundbreaking: 1930
- Opened: October 26, 1930; 96 years ago
- Renovated: 1936, 1968, 1993, 2008, 2024–2025
- Expanded: 1948–1949, 1993, 2008
- Cost: $328,200 ($6.33 million in 2025)
- Architects: Mark Lemmon, 1930; George Dahl, 1936; Hellmuth, Obata & Kassabaum, 1993
- Structural engineers: Chappell, Stokes & Brenneke, 1948–1949

Tenants
- College football State Fair Classic (NCAA) (1925–2019, 2021–present) SMU Mustangs (NCAA) (1932–1978, 1995–1999) Red River Rivalry (NCAA) (1932–present) Cotton Bowl Classic (NCAA) (1937–2009) First Responder Bowl (NCAA) (2011–2018) Professional football Dallas Texans (NFL) (1952) Dallas Texans (AFL) (1960–1962) Dallas Cowboys (NFL) (1960–1971) Dallas Desire (LFL) (2010) Soccer Dallas Tornado (NASL) (1967–1968) Dallas Burn/FC Dallas (MLS) (1996–2002, 2004–2005) Dallas Trinity FC (USLS) (2024–present) Atlético Dallas (USLC) (beginning 2027)

Website
- Official website
- The Cotton Bowl
- U.S. Historic district – Contributing property
- Texas State Antiquities Landmark
- Dallas Landmark Historic District; Contributing Property
- Architectural style: Art Deco
- Part of: Texas Centennial Exposition Buildings (1936–1937) (ID86003488)
- TSAL No.: 8200000209
- DLMKHD No.: H/33 (Fair Park)

Significant dates
- Designated CP: September 24, 1986
- Designated TSAL: January 1, 1984
- Designated DLMKHD: March 4, 1987

The Cotton Bowl is an outdoor stadium in Dallas, Texas, United States. Opened in 1930 as Fair Park Stadium, it is on the site of the State Fair of Texas, known as Fair Park.

The Cotton Bowl was the longtime home of the annual college football post-season bowl game known as the Cotton Bowl Classic, after which the stadium is named. Starting on New Year's Day 1937, it hosted the first 73 editions of the game, through January 2009; the game was moved to AT&T Stadium in Arlington in January 2010. The stadium hosts the Red River Rivalry, the annual college football game between the Oklahoma Sooners and the Texas Longhorns, and formerly, the First Responder Bowl.

The stadium has been home to many football teams over the years, including: SMU Mustangs (NCAA), Dallas Cowboys (NFL; 1960–1971), Dallas Texans (NFL) (1952), Dallas Texans (AFL; 1960–1962), and soccer teams, the Dallas Tornado (NASL; 1967–1968), FC Dallas (MLS; as the Dallas Burn 1996–2004, as FC Dallas 2005), and Dallas Trinity FC (USLS; 2024–). It was also one of the nine venues used for the 1994 FIFA World Cup. Prior to Dallas Trinity's inaugural season, it was the largest stadium by capacity in the United States without a professional or college team as a regular tenant.

It became known as "The House That Doak Built", due to the large crowds that SMU running back Doak Walker drew to the stadium during his college career in the late 1940s.

Artificial turf was installed in 1970 and removed in 1993 in preparation for the 1994 FIFA World Cup. The elevation of the playing field is approximately 450 feet (140 m) above sea level.

== History ==
Construction of Fair Park Stadium began in 1930 on the same site as a wooden football stadium that had also been known by the same name. Completed that year, the first game in the stadium was between Dallas-area high schools in October 1930. The original stadium–the lower half of the current facility–was built for a cost of $328,000 and seated 45,507 spectators. The stadium hosted the 1934 Dixie Classic bowl game. The name of the stadium was officially changed to the Cotton Bowl in 1936.

In 1948, a second deck was added to the west side, increasing capacity to 67,000. The east side was double-decked the following year, increasing capacity to 75,504. These decks were added to respond to the demand for fans to watch SMU halfback Doak Walker, leading the Cotton Bowl to be known as "the house that Doak built." The superstructure was also built at this time, creating the distinctive facade for the stadium. In 1968, chair-backs were installed, reducing capacity to 72,032. In 1970, the Cotton Bowl installed an AstroTurf surface, which remained until 1993.

In 1950, as a way to break the Texas League record for opening-day attendance, Richard Burnett got permission to play in the Cotton Bowl, which at the time could hold as many as 75,000. In order to draw a big crowd, he wanted a lineup of former stars to don Dallas Eagles uniforms and face one Tulsa hitter in the top of the first inning. Most of the retired stars were cool to the idea, except for then-current Dallas Eagles manager Charlie Grimm. When the legendary Ty Cobb agreed to come to Dallas, the others followed his lead. Preceding the game was a parade through downtown Dallas. "It was the pre-game show that got 'em", bellowed Dizzy Dean by way of self-congratulation. "Cobb, Cochrane, Home Run Baker, Speaker, and Ol' Diz in Dallas duds". The 54,151 who attended saw Ty Cobb hit several balls into the stands, just to show he could still handle the bat. The Kilgore College Rangerettes drill team performed on the field prior to the game. Texas governor Allan Shivers threw out the first pitch. Defensively, the old-timer lineup of the Eagles were: Duffy Lewis in left field, Cobb in center field, Texas native Tris Speaker in right field, Frank "Home Run" Baker at third base, Travis Jackson at shortstop, Charlie Gehringer at second base, manager Grimm at first base, Mickey Cochrane at catcher, and former Houston Buffaloes star pitcher Dizzy Dean on the mound. Dean walked the leadoff batter for Tulsa, Harry Donabedian, on a 3–2 count, and then the regular Dallas players took the field. Dean got into an orchestrated rhubarb and was tossed from the game. The attendance figure still stands as the largest in Texas League history and second largest in the history of the minor leagues.

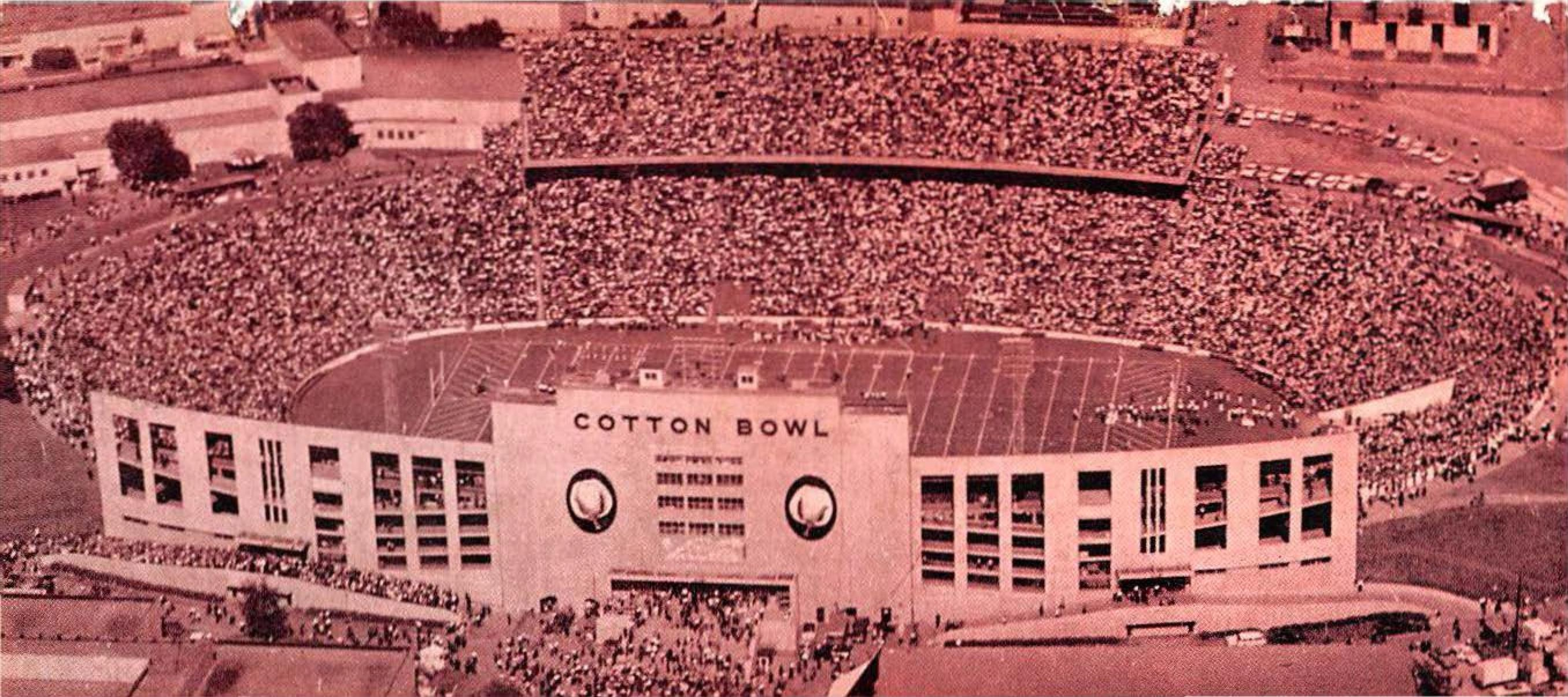
The stadium as featured in the media guide for the 1965 Cotton Bowl Classic

In their seventh season, the Cowboys hosted the Green Bay Packers for the NFL championship at the Cotton Bowl on January 1, 1967. The college bowl game that year included SMU and was played the day before, New Year's Eve, which required a quick turnaround to transform the field. The two games were filled to its 75,504 capacity, but both home teams lost to the visitors.

The Cotton Bowl hosted six matches of the 1994 World Cup. To meet FIFA requirements for these games the stadium field was widened, the press box was enlarged and natural grass was re-installed. The playing surface has remained natural grass ever since. Capacity was decreased to 71,615 in 1994 and to 68,252 in 1996. The Stadium also hosted the Gold Cup Soccer Matches in 1993.

In the 2000s (decade), the renewed dominance of both the Oklahoma Sooners and the Texas Longhorns created a new interest in their rivalry, and the stadium. Temporary stands were erected in each end zone to increase seating for these games from just over 68,000 to 90,000.

In November 2006, the city of Dallas and the State Fair of Texas finally agreed on funding for a long-planned $50 million renovation, with $30 million of this amount from a city bond. Thus, in April 2007, the schools signed a contract to play at the Cotton Bowl through 2015, coupled with a $57 million fund for upgrades and improvements to the aging stadium. The 2008 Red River Showdown was held on October 11.

The 2008 renovations include the expansion of the seating capacity of the stadium from 68,252 to 92,100, mostly through the complete encircling of the second deck, new media and VIP facilities, a new scoreboard and video screen, updated restrooms and concession areas, lighting, utility and sound upgrades and the replacement of all the stadium's seats. A new record for attendance was set when 96,009 fans attended the 2009 Texas vs. Oklahoma football game.

The renovation was also intended to increase the chances of the Cotton Bowl Classic becoming a part of the Bowl Championship Series. However, the renovation was not enough to prevent the Cotton Bowl Classic from moving out of its namesake stadium after the 2009 game. Dallas' occasionally cold January weather had been a longstanding concern for the game, and was believed to have precluded any prospect of adding it to the BCS even after the expansion. (The Cotton Bowl Classic would eventually be added to the "New Year's Six" College Football Playoff bowls after the game moved to what is now AT&T Stadium.)

On January 1, 2020, the NHL Winter Classic was held at the Cotton Bowl. Over 85,000 attended the match between the Dallas Stars and Nashville Predators.

On December 6, 2023, it was announced the Red River Rivalry would stay in the Cotton Bowl through 2036. It was also announced with the single largest investment into the stadium from the city of Dallas with an estimated $140 million two-year renovation.

== Stadium usage ==
The Cotton Bowl has been used by a number of teams in several sports throughout its history, and has hosted three collegiate bowl games. The Cotton Bowl has also hosted large music concerts, including the inaugural Texxas Jam and other similar events.

=== American football ===
==== Cotton Bowl Classic ====
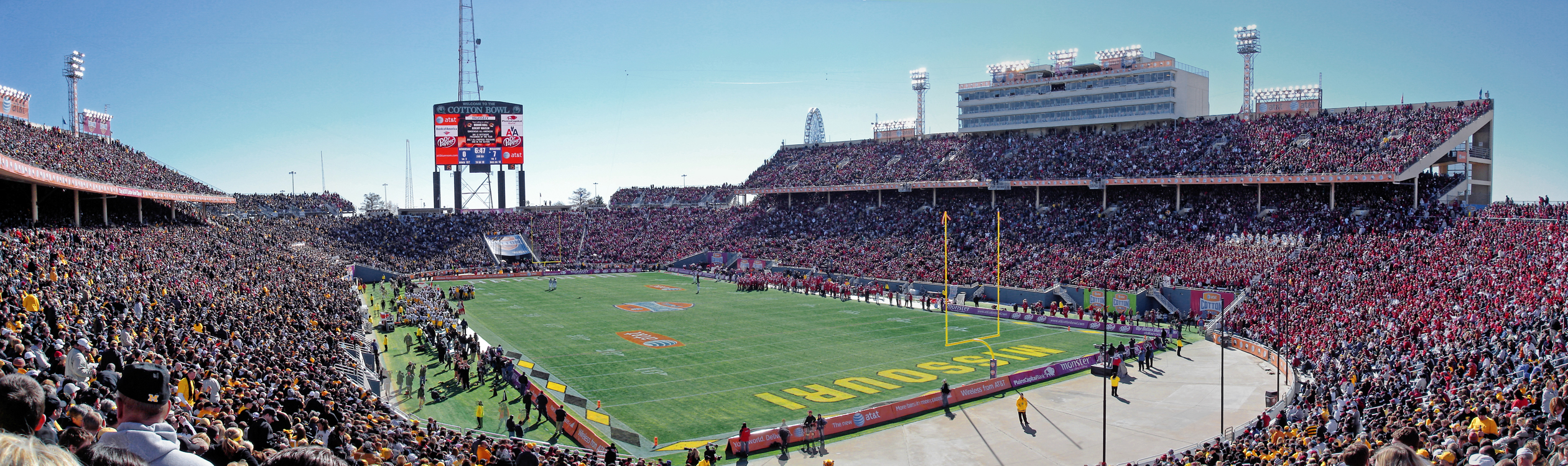
Panoramic view of the 2008 Cotton Bowl Classic between Missouri and Arkansas

From 1937 to 2009, the Cotton Bowl hosted the Cotton Bowl Classic, an annual NCAA Division I bowl game. Beginning in 2010, the bowl game has been played at AT&T Stadium in Arlington. From 1941 to 1994, the Southwest Conference champion would play in the bowl game; since 1997, the first postseason of the Big 12 Conference, its second-place team has competed against an SEC team in the Cotton Bowl Classic.

==== Dallas Texans (NFL) ====
The first professional football team in Texas was the Dallas Texans of the National Football League in 1952. Plagued by financial hardship and poor play, the Texans lasted only one season. The team played four games in the Cotton Bowl before going bankrupt, being taken over by the league, and finishing the season as a traveling team based in Hershey, Pennsylvania.

==== Dallas Cowboys ====
The Dallas Cowboys called the Cotton Bowl home for 12 seasons, from the team's formation in 1960 until 1971. The 1966 NFL Championship Game between the Cowboys and Green Bay Packers was played in the Cotton Bowl. After playing their first two home games in 1971 at the Cotton Bowl, the Cowboys opened Texas Stadium in Irving on October 24.

==== Dallas Texans (AFL) ====
The Dallas Texans of the American Football League used the stadium all three of their seasons in Dallas (1960–1962), sharing it with the NFL Cowboys. Following the Texans' 1962 AFL Championship season, owner Lamar Hunt moved the franchise to Kansas City, Missouri and renamed it the Chiefs.

==== First Responder Bowl ====
From January 2011 until 2018, the Cotton Bowl was the home of the First Responder Bowl, an annual college football bowl game. The game was tentatively named the "Dallas Football Classic" prior to TicketCity being announced as the bowl game's first title sponsor. The game was called the "TicketCity Bowl" for the first two match ups. On October 4, 2012, the name changed again to the "Heart of Dallas Bowl" for eight seasons before changing to the "First Responder Bowl" for the 2018 season. In 2019 the game was relocated to Gerald J. Ford Stadium at Southern Methodist University in University Park, Texas, to accommodate the 2020 NHL Winter Classic. While originally a temporary measure, the game has remained at Ford Stadium in succeeding years.

The game has had bowl tie-ins with the Big 12 Conference in 2011, Conference USA in 2012, and the Big Ten Conference in both 2011 and 2012. The inaugural game saw the Texas Tech Red Raiders defeat the Northwestern Wildcats, 45–38.

==== Red River Rivalry ====
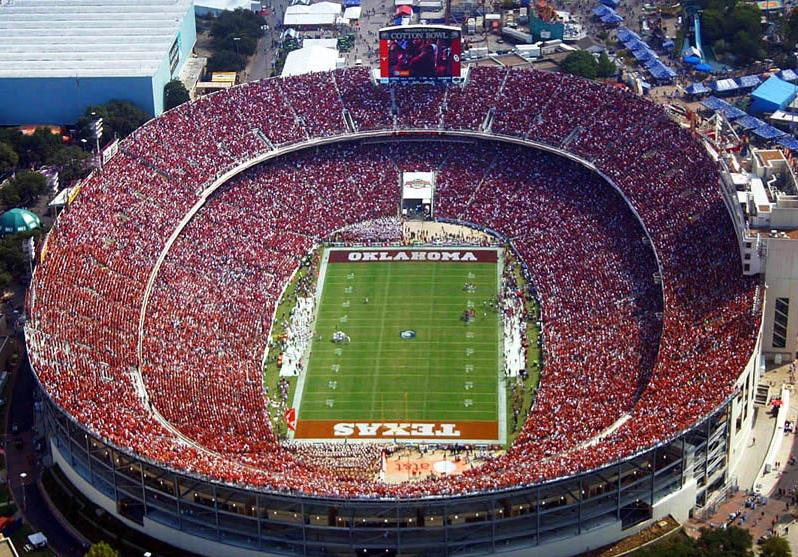
Red River Rivalry in 2010

The annual college football game between the University of Texas and the University of Oklahoma Sooners, also known before 2005 as the Red River Shootout, is played at the Cotton Bowl during the State Fair of Texas, instead of on either school's campus. Ticket sales are equally divided between the two schools, and the fans are split on the 50-yard line. Following the 2024 game, the Longhorns have a record of 64–51–5 against the Sooners.

==== SMU Mustangs ====
The Cotton Bowl served as the home for the SMU Mustangs football team for two periods in the program's history. SMU played at least a few games at the Cotton Bowl from 1932 onward. They gradually moved more of their home games there during the 1930s and 1940s, as it was double the size of their on-campus stadium, Ownby Stadium. The Mustangs moved there permanently in 1948 due to Doak Walker's popularity. The Mustangs played at the Cotton Bowl until 1978, when they moved to Texas Stadium.

The Cotton Bowl also served as home to SMU in the 1990s, after the team served the NCAA death penalty due to numerous recruiting violations, and spent the first six years after their return at Ownby Stadium. Games moved back to campus in 2000 with the completion of Gerald J. Ford Stadium.

==== State Fair Classic ====
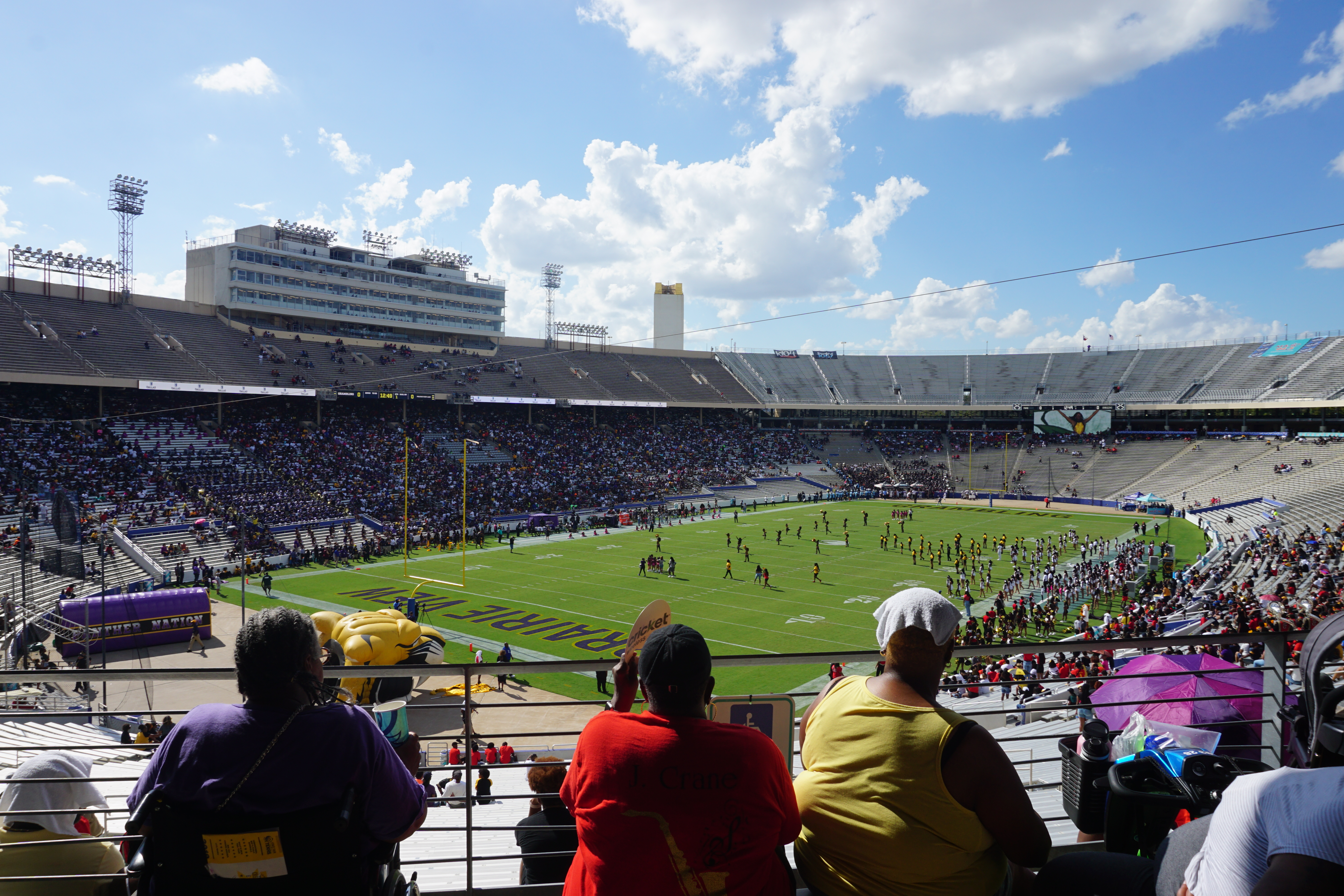
The Cotton Bowl before the 2019 State Fair Classic

In addition to the Red River Rivalry, the Grambling State University Tigers and the Prairie View A&M University Panthers play each other at the Cotton Bowl in the State Fair Classic. This game often occurs the weekend before the Texas-OU Red River Rivalry game. It is a neutral site for both teams; Grambling State is located in northern Louisiana and Prairie View A&M is located about 30 miles (48 km) northwest of Houston. The halftime show, the "Battle of the Bands", is arguably more eagerly anticipated than the game itself. The State Fair Classic is heavily marketed in the Dallas – Fort Worth Metroplex, with local hip hop stations encouraging a large turnout among the region's African-American community. The State Fair Classic is currently the largest FCS football game in Texas.

==== Texas State Fair Classic Showdown ====
In 2016, the Texas State Fair in conjunction with the City of Dallas announced an expansion of games played during the state fair for 2018 and 2019. Following the Red River Rivalry weekend, the Texas Southern University Tigers played against the Southern University Jaguars. The game was on a neutral site for both teams, Texas Southern University is centrally located in Houston and Southern University is located in Baton Rouge, Louisiana (South Louisiana). The two schools are long-time SWAC rivals and have nationally recognized marching bands.

==== Texas high school football ====
The Cotton Bowl has a long history of hosting Texas high school football games. From the early days of the stadium, it was used for playoff and championship games. In 1945 and 1967, the stadium hosted two of the largest audiences to ever see a Texas high school football game. In 2011 and 2012, it played host to the North Texas Football Classic to kick off those seasons.

==== Powderpuff football ====
Blondes vs. Brunettes powderpuff football games are played in cities across the United States. Proceeds from the event are donated to The Alzheimer's Association. The annual contests were started by Sara Allen Abbott whose father, Texas State Representative Joseph Hugh Allen, died of Alzheimer's disease in 2008. Looking for a way to raise funds for The Alzheimer's Association, Abbott organized a powderpuff football game in tribute to her father, a lifelong football fan. The games are currently played in over 20 cities throughout the United States. The increasing popularity of the game in the Dallas area resulted in moving the 2012 game to the Cotton Bowl where it could accommodate a larger crowd.

=== Association football ===
==== 1994 FIFA World Cup ====
Date	Time (UTC−6)	Team #1	Res.	Team #2	Round	Attendance
June 17, 1994	18:30	Spain	2–2	South Korea	Group C	56,247
June 23, 1994	18:30	Nigeria	3–0	Bulgaria	Group D	44,132
June 28, 1994	15:00	Germany	3–2	South Korea	Group C	63,998
June 30, 1994	18:30	Argentina	0–2	Bulgaria	Group D	63,998
July 3, 1994	12:00	Saudi Arabia	1–3	Sweden	Round of 16	60,277
July 9, 1994	14:35	Netherlands	2–3	Brazil	Quarter-final	63,500

==== 2021 CONCACAF Gold Cup ====
Date	Time (UTC−5)	Team #1	Res.	Team #2	Round	Attendance
July 14, 2021	20:30	Guatemala	0–3	Mexico	Group A	15,391
July 18, 2021	21:00	Mexico	1–0	El Salvador	Group A	45,792

On July 29, 2014, the Cotton Bowl hosted a soccer match between Real Madrid and A.S. Roma which was part of the 2014 International Champions Cup and AS Roma won the match 1–0. It also hosted 6 matches of the 1994 FIFA World Cup.

==== Other international matches ====
Date	Team #1	Res.	Team #2	Attendance
September 8, 1974	Mexico	1–0	United States	22,164
July 10, 1993	Jamaica	0–1	United States	11,642
July 14, 1993	Panama	1–2	United States	13,771
July 17, 1993	Honduras	0–1	United States	16,348
July 21, 1993	Costa Rica	0–1	United States	14,826
March 26, 1994	Bolivia	2–2	United States	26,835
March 25, 1995	Uruguay	2–2	United States	12,242
April 28, 2004	Mexico	0–1	United States	45,048

==== Dallas Tornado ====
Early in their existence, the Dallas Tornado played two seasons of professional soccer in the Cotton Bowl. They spent their inaugural year, 1967, as a franchise of the United Soccer Association and 1968 as members of the North American Soccer League in the Cotton Bowl. For the Tornado, a wider field was installed that required several storm drains to be moved. The team moved to P.C. Cobb Stadium for the 1969 season and played at four more venues in the Dallas area before they folded after the 1981 season.

==== Dallas Burn ====
The Dallas Burn, a founding member of Major League Soccer (MLS), played at the Cotton Bowl for their first seven seasons between 1996 and 2002. Their first match, played in front of 27,779 spectators on April 14, 1996, was a 1–0 win against the San Jose Clash. The Burn paid $15,000 per match at the Cotton Bowl and lacked control over scheduling and concession sales; the team drew an average attendance of roughly 12,000 to 15,000 until they moved in 2003 to Dragon Stadium in Southlake, Texas.

The Burn (later renamed FC Dallas) returned to the Cotton Bowl for the 2004 and 2005 seasons while preparing to open their own stadium in Frisco. Their final regular season match at the Cotton Bowl was a 2–2 draw with the San Jose Earthquakes on July 3, 2005. FC Dallas later returned to the Cotton Bowl for a doubleheader with a Mexico–Colombia international friendly on September 30, 2009. The event drew 51,012 spectators to the stadium. FC Dallas would not return to the Cotton Bowl until 2024 when they played a preseason friendly against Inter Miami CF, whose popularity had surged following the signing of Lionel Messi.

==== Dallas Trinity FC ====
Dallas Trinity FC, a women's professional soccer team and founding member of the USL Super League, currently plays at the Cotton Bowl. Their first home game was an exhibition match against FC Barcelona Femení on August 30, 2024, followed by their home season opener against DC Power FC on September 7, 2024.

==== Atlético Dallas ====
Atlético Dallas, an men's expansion club set to join the USL Championship, the second division of the American soccer system, in 2027. The club will start a three-year lease in the stadium once they begin play, which would be set to expire in 2029.

=== Ice hockey ===
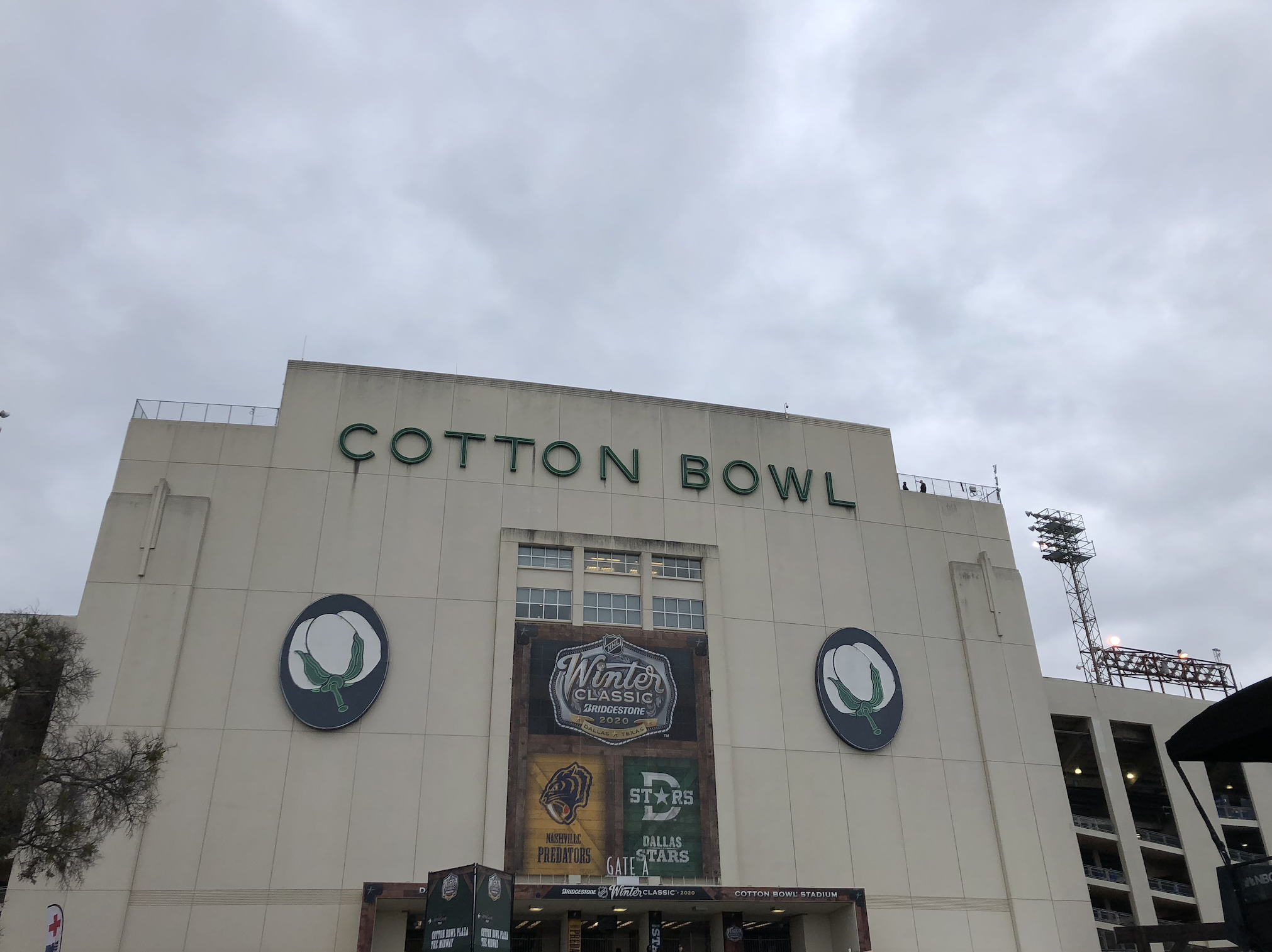
The Cotton Bowl ahead of the 2020 Winter Classic.

==== NHL Winter Classic ====
The 2020 NHL Winter Classic was held at the Cotton Bowl on January 1, 2020. The game was hosted by the Dallas Stars against the Nashville Predators; the Dallas Stars won. It was the first Winter Classic appearance for both teams. It also marked the first outdoor NHL game to be hosted in a southern state. The Stars defeated the Predators in a 4–2 comeback victory. Recorded attendance was 85,630, the third highest ever for an NHL game (second highest at the time).

=== Concerts ===
==== Music ====
The stadium has also been a venue for a number of historic concerts, most notably that which featured then 21-year-old Elvis Presley, which took place on October 11, 1956, and attracted what was then the largest audience in Texas history for an outdoor concert, in excess of 27,000.

Many consecutive summers of huge concerts, featuring several artists, began in July 1978, with the 1st annual Texxas Jam, which sold out with over 80,000 attendees. For crowd control purposes, ticket sales for any future Cotton Bowl General Admission floor seating was limited, and Jams following the 1978 Jam, never reached 80,000 for that reason. Each Texxas Jam had a unique lineup of major artists chosen by the promoter. Over the years, the Texxas Jam featured some of the top-billed headliner artists of the day, including Aerosmith, Heart, Deep Purple, Boston, Journey, Ted Nugent, Scorpions, Loverboy, Cheap Trick, Van Halen, Blue Öyster Cult, Sammy Hagar, Nazareth, Styx, Foghat, Santana, The Eagles & Triumph, among others.

The annual events came to an end in the summer of 1988, when Van Halen headlined the "Monsters Of Rock" Tour. U2 played here during the first leg of the Popmart Tour

Since then, the stadium has continued to be used as a major concert venue; Eric Clapton held his first three-day Crossroads Guitar Festival there in 2004.

South Korean boy band BTS was set to perform at the stadium on May 9–10, 2020 as part of their Map of the Soul Tour; however, the shows were canceled due to the COVID-19 pandemic.

The Rolling Stones have played 7 shows at the Cotton Bowl July 6, 1975, October 31, 1981, November 1, 1981, November 10, 1989, November 11, 1989, November 18, 1994, and November 2, 2021.

Date	Artist	Opening act(s)	Tour / Concert name	Attendance	Revenue	Notes
October 11, 1956	Elvis			27,000+		
July 6, 1975	Rolling Stones					
October 31 – November 1, 1981	Rolling Stones	ZZ Top	Tattoo You Tour	156,000 / 156,000	$2,695,332	
December 4, 1982	The Who		The Who Tour 1982	66,611 / 80,000	$1,165,693	
September 13 and 14 1985	Bruce Springsteen		Born in the U.S.A. Tour	126,707 / 126,707	$2,194,492	
September 3, 1989	The Who		The Who Tour 1989	35,385 / 36,000	$796,163	
November 10 and 11 1989	Rolling Stones		Steel Wheels/Urban Jungle Tour	119,856 / 119,856	$3,410,886	
October 10, 1990	ZZ Top	Steve Miller Band	Recycler World Tour	74,100 / 74,100	$1,715,688	
November 18, 1994	Rolling Stones		Voodoo Lounge Tour	47,372 / 47,372	$2,530,185	
May 12, 1997	U2	Rage Against The Machine	PopMart Tour	38,043 / 45,000	$1,908,637	
November 2, 2021	Rolling Stones	Juanes	No Filter Tour	43,469 / 43,469	$8,965,725	
May 6, 2022	Coldplay	H.E.R. Leila Pari	Music of the Spheres World Tour	58,669 / 58,669	$6,065,763	
September 2, 2023	Karol G	Agudelo	Mañana Será Bonito Tour	68,914 / 68,914	$11,313,933	

==== Drum Corps ====
The Cotton Bowl hosted both the 1971 VFW National Championships and the 1991 Drum Corps International World Championships.

== In popular culture ==
- Football game scenes from the 1977 film Semi-Tough were filmed in the Cotton Bowl.
- The stadium was featured in a 1981 episode of Dallas where J. R. Ewing meets Dusty Farlow.
- In The Texas Chainsaw Massacre 2, two young men are on their way to the Cotton Bowl when they are killed.
- The Cotton Bowl is featured in the 1983 Marvel promotional comic book Uncanny X-Men at the State Fair of Texas.
- The rock band Journey recorded two videos in the 1980s in the Cotton Bowl.
- The daytime scenes from the video "I Won't Forget You" by the rock band Poison were recorded during the 1987 Texxas Jam on June 20, 1987, in front of over 80,000 people.
- The rock band Rush played their first concert in the Cotton Bowl in 1979 at Texxas Jam, and again in 1984.
- The 2009 television reality series 4th and Long filmed the majority of its material at the Cotton Bowl.
- In the 1984 Emmy Award-winning made-for-TV film The Jesse Owens Story, made by Paramount Pictures, the Cotton Bowl was used as the Berlin Olympic Stadium for the 1936 Olympics. A local flag maker had to make large Nazi flags and banners to cover up Cotton Bowl emblems and other Texas State Fair items to give the impression that the film took place in Berlin, Germany in 1936.
- In 2010, a commercial for McDonald's was filmed at the Cotton Bowl. The commercial featured Donald Driver, wide receiver for the Green Bay Packers.
- A 2010 episode of The Good Guys, entitled "Dan on the Run," culminated at the Cotton Bowl.
- The WCCW Cotton Bowl Extravaganza was an annual professional wrestling supercard promoted by Fritz Von Erich's World Class Championship Wrestling / World Class Wrestling Association. It was held in October every year from 1984 through 1988.
- The stadium was the location of the Texas High School State Championship game with the East Dillon Lions in the series finale of Friday Night Lights.

== Sources ==
- "Baseball in the Lone Star State: Texas League's Greatest Hits", Tom Kayser and David King, Trinity University Press 2005
- "Storied Stadiums: Baseball History Through Its Ballparks", Curt Smith, c.2001

== See also ==
- National Register of Historic Places listings in Dallas County, Texas
- List of Dallas Landmarks
- Lists of stadiums

Events and tenants
Preceded by first stadium	Home of the Dallas Cowboys; 1960 – October 11, 1971	Succeeded by Texas Stadium
Preceded by first stadium	Home of the Dallas Texans; 1960–1962	Succeeded by Municipal Stadium
Preceded by first stadium Dragon Stadium	Home of the Dallas Burn; 1996–2002; 2004–2005	Succeeded by Dragon Stadium; Pizza Hut Park
Preceded by first stadium	Home of the Cotton Bowl Classic; 1937–2009	Succeeded by Cowboys Stadium
Preceded by Rich Stadium	Host of the Drum Corps International; World Championship; 1991	Succeeded by Camp Randall Stadium
Preceded by Notre Dame Stadium	Host of the NHL Winter Classic; 2020	Succeeded by Target Field
Preceded by first stadium	Home of the Dallas Trinity FC; 2024–present	Succeeded by current stadium
