= 2025 First Responder Bowl (December) =

Postseason college football bowl game

2025 Servpro First Responder Bowl
- 16th First Responder Bowl
FIU Panthers	UTSA Roadrunners
(7–5)	(6–6)
CUSA	American
20	57
Head coach: Willie Simmons	Head coach: Jeff Traylor
	1	2	3	4	Total
FIU	14	0	6	0	20
UTSA	14	17	9	17	57
- Date: December 26, 2025
- Season: 2025
- Stadium: Gerald J. Ford Stadium
- Location: Dallas, Texas (Note: The stadium has a Dallas mailing address but is physically located in the separate city of University Park.)
- MVP: Owen McCown (QB, UTSA)
- Favorite: UTSA by 6
- Referee: Steven Robinson (Sun Belt)
- Attendance: 8,671

United States TV coverage
- Network: ESPN
- Announcers: Anish Shroff (play-by-play), Andre Ware (analyst), and Paul Carcaterra (sideline)

International TV coverage
- Network: ESPN Deportes

The 2025 First Responder Bowl was a college football bowl game played on December 26, 2025, at Gerald J. Ford Stadium in University Park, Texas. The 16th annual First Responder Bowl began at approximately 7:00 p.m. CST and aired on ESPN. It was one of the 2025–26 bowl games concluding the 2025 FBS football season. Sponsored by cleanup and restoration company Servpro, the game was officially known as the Servpro First Responder Bowl.

In the 2025 First Responder Bowl, the UTSA Roadrunners beat the FIU Panthers by a score of 57–20.

== Teams ==
The FIU Panthers (7–5, 5–3 Conference USA) and UTSA Roadrunners (6–6, 4–4 American) accepted invitations to play in the First Responder Bowl. FIU became a first-time participant in the game; UTSA had played in the 2020 edition. The two once spent time together in the Conference USA. FIU and UTSA had previously faced off four times, with each team winning twice. The Roadrunners won their most recent prior meeting, 30–10, in 2022, at Pitbull Stadium (then FIU Stadium) in Miami.

=== FIU ===
The Panthers entered the bowl led by Willie Simmons in his first year as the head coach. With a win over Jacksonville State on November 22, the Golden Panthers clinched bowl eligibility for the first time since 2019. The following week, with a win over Sam Houston, they also clinched their first winning season since 2018.

=== UTSA ===
Entering the bowl, head coach Jeff Traylor had a 52–26 (.667) record through six seasons piloting the Roadrunners, with UTSA bowl-eligible each season. In its 15th year in the Football Bowl Subdivision (FBS), this was the team's seventh all-time bowl game. The Roadrunners had a 2–4 record in previous bowls, including back-to-back wins in 2023 and 2024.

== Game summary ==
2025 Servpro First Responder Bowl

Quarter	1	2	3	4	Total
FIU	14	0	6	0	20
UTSA	14	17	9	17	57

at Gerald J. Ford Stadium • Dallas, Texas

- Date: Friday, December 26, 2025
- Game time: 7:00 p.m. CST
- Game weather: Clear
- Game attendance: 8,671
- Referee: Steve Robinson
- TV announcers (ESPN): Anish Shroff (play-by-play), Andre Ware (analyst), and Paul Carcaterra (sideline)
- Box score

=== Statistics ===
Statistics	FIU	UTSA
First downs	22	25
Plays–yards	78–255	71–481
Rushes–yards	29–79	40–186
Passing yards	176	295
Passing: comp–att–int	21–49–2	18–31–0
Time of possession	28:54	31:06

Team	Category	Player	Statistics
FIU	Passing	Joe Pesansky	11/31, 102 yards, 2 TD, INT
FIU	Rushing	Kejon Owens	8 carries, 36 yards
FIU	Receiving	JoJo Stone	4 receptions, 28 yards
UTSA	Passing	Owen McCown	18/28, 295 yards, 3 TD
UTSA	Rushing	Will Henderson III	14 carries, 59 yards, 2 TD
UTSA	Receiving	Devin McCuin	6 receptions, 73 yards, TD
