= First Responder Bowl =

College football bowl game in Dallas, Texas, US

- Servpro First Responder Bowl
- Stadium: Gerald J. Ford Stadium
- Location: University Park, Texas
- Previous stadiums: Cotton Bowl (2011–2018)
- Previous locations: Fair Park, Dallas, Texas (2011–2018)
- Operated: 2011–present
- Conference tie-ins: American, ACC, Big 12, C-USA
- Previous conference tie-ins: Big Ten
- Payout: US$824,545 (2019)
- Website: firstresponderbowl.com

Sponsors
- TicketCity (2011–2012); PlainsCapital Bank (2013); Zaxby's (2014–2017); Servpro (2018–present)

Former names
- Dallas Football Classic (2011, working title); TicketCity Bowl (2011–2012); Heart of Dallas Bowl presented by PlainsCapital Bank (2013–Jan 2014); Zaxby's Heart of Dallas Bowl (Dec 2014–2017)

2025 matchup
- FIU vs. UTSA (UTSA 57–20)

The First Responder Bowl is an NCAA post-season college football bowl game played annually in the Dallas, Texas, area. The bowl was first held on January 1, 2011, and since 2014 has been contested in late December. The bowl was held at the Cotton Bowl in Fair Park in Dallas through the 2018 game. Since the Cotton Bowl was being used for the 2020 NHL Winter Classic and was not available, the 2019 edition of the bowl was played at Gerald J. Ford Stadium on the campus of Southern Methodist University (SMU) in nearby University Park, Texas. That stadium has remained the home of the bowl.

Originally commissioned as the Dallas Football Classic, it has undergone name changes due to changes in sponsorship. From 2011 to 2012, it was named the TicketCity Bowl after sponsor TicketCity. It was then known as the Heart of Dallas Bowl when PlainsCapital Bank (2013) and Zaxby's (2014–2017) were its sponsors. Since 2018, the game has been sponsored by Servpro and officially known as the Servpro First Responder Bowl.

== History ==
The game was tentatively called the Dallas Football Classic until TicketCity, an online reseller of sports and entertainment tickets, became the first title sponsor, renaming the game as the TicketCity Bowl. This game physically replaced the Cotton Bowl Classic, which moved from its longtime eponymous home to AT&T Stadium in nearby Arlington in 2010. In the 2011 edition, the inaugural playing of the bowl, Texas Tech of the Big 12 Conference defeated Northwestern of the Big Ten Conference.

After its first two playings, the bowl was renamed as the Heart of Dallas Bowl. The 2013 edition, the first to be so named, saw Oklahoma State of the Big 12 defeat Purdue of the Big Ten. PlainsCapital Bank was the title sponsor in 2013, followed by Zaxby's as the title sponsor from 2014 to 2017.

The 2018 edition was the first to be named the First Responder Bowl, with Servpro as the title sponsor. That game was cancelled due to severe weather with 5:08 remaining in the first quarter, and is considered a no-contest for the teams involved; Boise State of the Mountain West Conference and Boston College of the Atlantic Coast Conference (ACC).

After having been played on January 1 or January 2 for its first four editions, the game moved to a late December date beginning with the 2014 season.

== Stadium ==
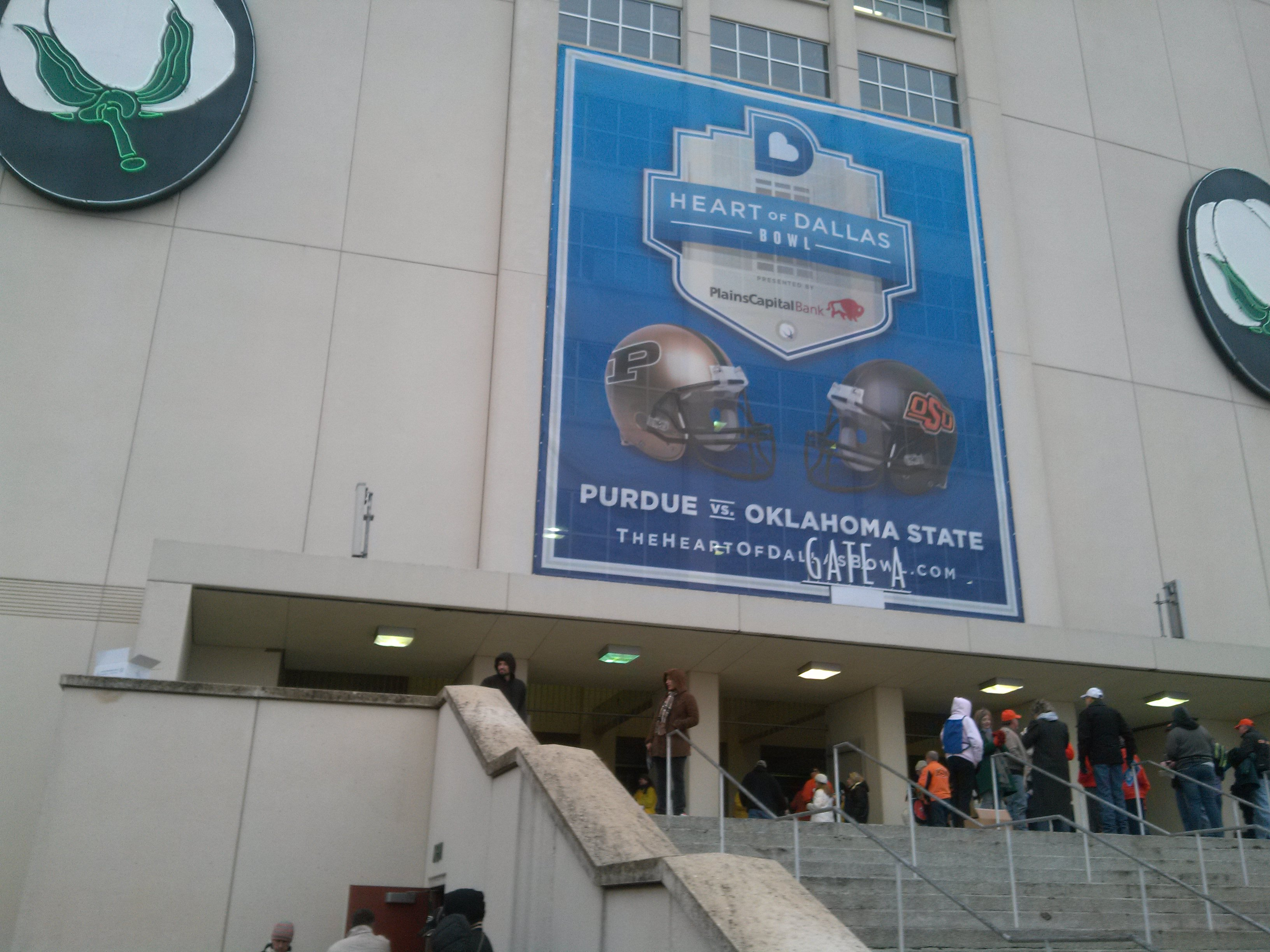
2013 Heart of Dallas Bowl banner over the Cotton Bowl entrance

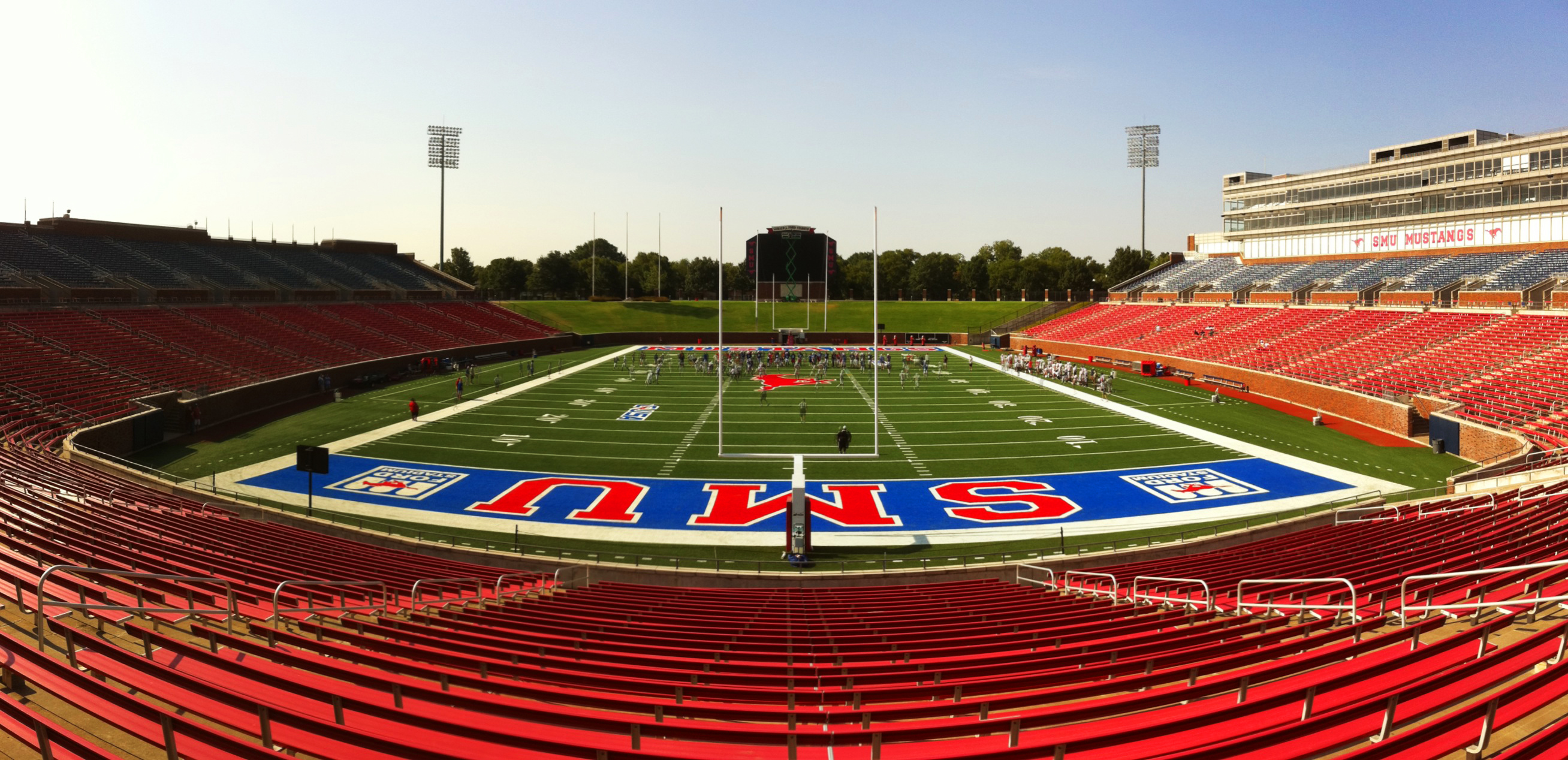
Gerald J. Ford Stadium in 2011

The bowl was held at Cotton Bowl stadium from 2011 through 2018. Originally known as the Fair Park Bowl, the stadium is located in Fair Park, Dallas, site of the State Fair of Texas. The Cotton Bowl Classic called the stadium home from that bowl's inception in 1937 until 2009, after which it moved to what is now AT&T Stadium. Other tenants included, at various times, SMU Mustangs football, the Dallas Texans and Dallas Cowboys of the National Football League (NFL), and the Dallas Texans of the American Football League.

The bowl's 2019 edition was held at Gerald J. Ford Stadium in University Park, Texas, to accommodate the 2020 NHL Winter Classic at the Cotton Bowl. The stadium has been the home field of the SMU Mustangs since 2000, and hosted the Armed Forces Bowl in 2010 and 2011. The First Responder Bowl has remained at Gerald J. Ford Stadium since 2019.

== Tie-ins ==
For the bowl's first four editions, the Big Ten Conference was contracted to send a team each season, with alternating appearances from the Big 12 Conference in even-numbered seasons and Conference USA (C-USA) in odd-numbered seasons. For the bowl's next six editions, C-USA was contracted to provide a team, which would face either a Big Ten or Big 12 team in an alternating manner.

Season	Contracted tie-ins		Actual participants	
2010*	Big Ten	Big 12	Big Ten	**Big 12**
2011*	Big Ten	C-USA	Big Ten	**C-USA**
2012*	Big Ten	Big 12	Big Ten	**Big 12**
2013*	Big Ten	C-USA	Mountain West	**C-USA**
2014	C-USA	Big Ten	**C-USA**	Big Ten
2015	C-USA	Big 12	C-USA	**Pac-12**
2016	C-USA	Big Ten	C-USA	**Independent**
2017	C-USA	Big 12	**Pac-12**	Big 12
2018	C-USA	Big Ten	Mountain West	ACC
2019	C-USA	Big 12	**C-USA**	MAC
2020	ACC, Big 12, C-USA; AAC (alt.)		C-USA	**Sun Belt**
Bold font denotes winners; * denotes a game played in January

For the 2013 season, the Big Ten did not have enough bowl-eligible teams, so the selection committee chose an at-large team, UNLV from the Mountain West Conference, to take their place. For the 2015 season, the Big 12 did not have enough bowl-eligible teams, so the selection committee selected the Washington Huskies from the Pac-12 Conference to take its place. For the 2016 season, the Big Ten sent four teams to CFP bowls, so the selection committee chose an at-large team, independent Army, to take its place. In 2017 and 2018, Conference USA was unable to send teams due to not enough members of their conference having bowl eligibility. In 2017, the Pac-12 sent Utah to face West Virginia from the Big 12. In 2018, the Big Ten did not have any remaining bowl eligible teams to send; the matchup, which was not played to completion, pitted Boise State of the Mountain West versus Boston College of the ACC. In 2019, Western Michigan became the first Mid-American Conference (MAC) team invited to the bowl.

In June 2019, the Big 12 renewed its rotating appearance schedule with the First Responder Bowl through the 2025 postseason. In December 2019, the Atlantic Coast Conference (ACC) announced a partial tie-in with the bowl beginning in the 2020 football season; the conference will send a team to one of three bowls (First Responder Bowl, Gasparilla Bowl, or Birmingham Bowl) annually. In May 2020, C-USA reached an agreement whereby it could send one or more teams to a pool of games, including the First Responder Bowl, which are operated by ESPN Events. As of the 2020 football season, the First Responder Bowl has the noted tie-ins with the ACC, Big 12, and C-USA; it also has the American Athletic Conference (AAC or "The American") as an alternate.

== Game results ==
Rankings are based on the AP Poll prior to the game being played.

Date played	Bowl name	Winning team		Losing team		Attendance
January 1, 2011	TicketCity Bowl	Texas Tech	45	Northwestern	38	40,121
January 2, 2012	TicketCity Bowl	20 Houston	30	24 Penn State	14	46,817
January 1, 2013	Heart of Dallas Bowl	Oklahoma State	58	Purdue	14	48,313
January 1, 2014	Heart of Dallas Bowl	North Texas	36	UNLV	14	38,380
December 26, 2014	Heart of Dallas Bowl	Louisiana Tech	35	Illinois	18	31,297
December 26, 2015	Heart of Dallas Bowl	Washington	44	Southern Miss	31	20,229
December 27, 2016	Heart of Dallas Bowl	Army	38	North Texas	31 (OT)	39,117
December 26, 2017	Heart of Dallas Bowl	Utah	30	West Virginia	14	20,507
December 26, 2018	First Responder Bowl	23 Boise State N/C Boston College				†
December 30, 2019	First Responder Bowl	Western Kentucky	23	Western Michigan	20	13,164
December 26, 2020	First Responder Bowl	16 Louisiana	31	UTSA	24	3,512‡
December 28, 2021	First Responder Bowl	Air Force	31	Louisville	28	15,251
December 27, 2022	First Responder Bowl	Memphis	38	Utah State	10	10,343
December 26, 2023	First Responder Bowl	Texas State	45	Rice	21	26,542
January 3, 2025	First Responder Bowl	Texas State	30	North Texas	28	28,725
December 26, 2025	First Responder Bowl	UTSA	57	FIU	20	8,671

† The 2018 game was a no-contest; game canceled due to weather.
‡ The 2020 contest had an unusually low attendance due to the COVID-19 pandemic.

First nine editions (2011–2018) played at the Cotton Bowl in Dallas, Texas
Subsequent games (2019–present) played at Gerald J. Ford Stadium in University Park, Texas

== MVPs ==
Year	Player	Team	Position	Ref.
2011	Taylor Potts	Texas Tech	QB	
2012	Case Keenum	Houston	QB	
2013	Clint Chelf	Oklahoma State	QB	
2014 (Jan.)	Derek Thompson	North Texas	QB	
2014 (Dec.)	Houston Bates	Louisiana Tech	LB	
2015	Myles Gaskin	Washington	RB	
2016	Ahmad Bradshaw	Army	QB	
2017	Julian Blackmon	Utah	CB	
2018	none selected			–
2019	Lucky Jackson	Western Kentucky	WR	
2020	Elijah Mitchell	Louisiana	RB	
2021	Haaziq Daniels	Air Force	QB	
2022	Seth Henigan	Memphis	QB	
2023	Brian Holloway	Texas State	LB	
2025 (Jan.)	Lincoln Pare	Texas State	RB	
2025 (Dec.)	Owen McCown	UTSA	QB	

== Most appearances ==
Updated through the December 2025 edition (16 games, 32 total appearances).

Teams with multiple appearances

Rank	Team	Appearances	Record
1	North Texas	3	1–2
2	Texas State	2	2–0
2	UTSA	2	1–1

Teams with a single appearance

Won (11): Air Force, Army, Houston, Louisiana, Louisiana Tech, Memphis, Oklahoma State, Texas Tech, Utah, Washington, Western Kentucky
Lost (12): Illinois, FIU, Louisville, Northwestern, Penn State, Purdue, Rice, Southern Miss, UNLV, Utah State, West Virginia, Western Michigan
No contest (2): Boise State, Boston College

== Appearances by conference ==
Updated through the December 2025 edition (16 games, 32 total appearances).

Conference	Record				Appearances by season		
Conference	Games	W	L	Win pct.	Won	Lost	No contest
CUSA	8	4	4	.500	2011*, 2013*, 2014, 2019	2015, 2016, 2020, 2025	
American	4	2	2	.500	2022, 2025	2023, 2024*	
Mountain West	4	1	2	.333	2021	2013*, 2022	2018
Big Ten	4	0	4	.000		2010*, 2011*, 2012*, 2014	
Sun Belt	3	3	0	1.000	2020, 2023, 2024*		
Big 12	3	2	1	.667	2010*, 2012*	2017	
Pac-12	2	2	0	1.000	2015, 2017		
ACC	2	0	1	.000		2021	2018
Independent	1	1	0	1.000	2016		
MAC	1	0	1	.000		2019	

- The 2018 game, scheduled between ACC and Mountain West teams, was a no-contest due to weather; no win or loss resulting.
- Games marked with an asterisk (*) were played in January of the following calendar year.
- Independent appearances: Army (2016)

== Game records ==
Team	Performance vs. Opponent	Year
Most points scored (one team)	58, Oklahoma State vs. Purdue	2013
Most points scored (losing team)	38, Northwestern vs. Texas Tech	2011
Most points scored (both teams)	83, Texas Tech vs. Northwestern	2011
Fewest Points Allowed	10, Memphis vs. Utah State	2022
Largest margin of victory	44, Oklahoma State vs. Purdue	2013
Total yards	600, Houston vs. Penn State (532 pass, 68 rush)	2012
Rushing yards	480, Army vs. North Texas	2016
Passing yards	532, Houston vs. Penn State	2012
First downs	34, Texas Tech vs. Northwestern	2011
Fewest yards allowed	153, Utah vs. West Virginia	2017
Fewest rushing yards allowed	22, Washington vs. Southern Miss	2015
Fewest passing yards allowed	53, North Texas vs. Army	2016
Individual	Performance, Team	Year
Total offense	542, Case Keenum (Houston) (532 pass, 10 rush)	2012
All-purpose yards	234, Patrick Edwards (Houston)	2012
Touchdowns (all-purpose)	4, Myles Gaskin (Washington)	2015
Rushing yards	181, Myles Gaskin (Washington)	2015
Rushing touchdowns	4, Myles Gaskin (Washington)	2015
Passing yards	532, Case Keenum (Houston)	2012
Passing touchdowns	4, Taylor Potts (Texas Tech)	2011
Receiving yards	228, Patrick Edwards (Houston)	2012
Receiving touchdowns	2, most recent: Eddie Lewis (Memphis)	2022
Tackles	15, shared by: Quentin Davie (Northwestern); Jeremy Timpf (Army)	2011; 2016
Sacks	4.5, Houston Bates (Louisiana Tech)	Dec. 2014
Interceptions	2, most recent: Brian Holloway (Texas State)	2023
Long Plays	Performance, Team	Year
Touchdown run	86 yds., shared by: Eric Stephens (Texas Tech); Myles Gaskin (Washington)	2011; 2015
Touchdown pass	80 yds., Cody Sokol to Kenneth Dixon (Louisiana Tech)	Dec. 2014
Kickoff return	100 yds., Jawhar Jordan (Louisville)	2021
Punt return	97 yds., Maguire Anderson (FIU)	2025
Interception return	88 yds., Kareem Ali (Western Michigan)	2019
Fumble return	37 yds., Daytawion Lowe (Oklahoma State)	2013
Punt	65 yds., Quinn Sharp (Oklahoma State)	2013
Field goal	53 yds., Connor Coles (Utah State)	2022

== Media coverage ==
ESPNU televised the first four games. Since December 2014, the game has aired on ESPN, with the exception in 2020 when the game was aired on ABC.
