= 2020 First Responder Bowl =

Postseason college football bowl game

2020 Servpro First Responder Bowl
- 11th First Responder Bowl
Louisiana Ragin' Cajuns	UTSA Roadrunners
(9–1)	(7–4)
Sun Belt	C–USA
31	24
Head coach: Billy Napier	Head coach: Jeff Traylor (Note: Prior to the game, Traylor tested positive for COVID-19. Associate head coach Barry Lunney Jr. was UTSA's acting head coach for the game.)
AP / Coaches / CFP; 16 / 17 / 19
	1	2	3	4	Total
Louisiana	7	10	7	7	31
UTSA	0	7	14	3	24
- Date: December 26, 2020
- Season: 2020
- Stadium: Gerald J. Ford Stadium
- Location: Dallas, Texas
- MVP: Elijah Mitchell (RB, Louisiana)
- Favorite: Louisiana by 14
- Referee: Riley Johnson (ACC)
- Attendance: 3,512

United States TV coverage
- Network: ABC
- Announcers: Anish Shroff (play-by-play), Tom Luginbill (analyst) and Quint Kessenich (sideline)

International TV coverage
- Network: ESPN Deportes

The 2020 First Responder Bowl was a college football bowl game played on December 26, 2020, with kickoff at 3:30 p.m. EST (2:30 p.m. local CST) on ABC. It was the 11th edition of the First Responder Bowl, and was one of the 2020–21 bowl games concluding the 2020 FBS football season. Sponsored by fire and water cleanup and restoration company Servpro, the game was officially known as the Servpro First Responder Bowl.

== Teams ==
Based on conference tie-ins, the First Responder Bowl was expected to feature teams from the American Athletic Conference (AAC), Atlantic Coast Conference (ACC), or the Big 12 Conference. The announced contest matches Louisiana of the Sun Belt Conference against UTSA of Conference USA (C-USA). This was the first meeting of the two programs.

=== Louisiana Ragin' Cajuns ===
Louisiana accepted their bid to the First Responder Bowl on December 20, 2020. The Ragin' Cajuns entered the bowl with a record of 9–1 (7–1 in conference play) and ranked 16th in the AP Poll. Their only loss of the season was to Coastal Carolina, who they were due to face in a rematch in the Sun Belt Championship Game, but it was cancelled due to COVID-19 effects within the Coastal Carolina program.

=== UTSA Roadrunners ===
UTSA accepted their bid to the First Responder Bowl on December 15, 2020. The Roadrunners had originally accepted a bid to play SMU in the Frisco Bowl, but that game was canceled due to COVID-19 problems at SMU. The Roadrunners entered the bowl with a record of 7–4 (5–2 in conference play). They faced one ranked team during the season, losing to BYU in October.

During the week prior to the game, UTSA head coach Jeff Traylor tested positive for COVID-19, and thus did not accompany the team to Dallas. Associate head coach and offensive coordinator Barry Lunney Jr. served as the Roadrunners' coach for the game.

== Game summary ==
2020 Servpro First Responder Bowl

Quarter	1	2	3	4	Total
No. 19 Louisiana	7	10	7	7	31
UTSA	0	7	14	3	24

at Gerald J. Ford Stadium • University Park, Texas

- Date: Saturday, December 26, 2020
- Game time: 3:30 p.m. EST (2:30 p.m. CST)
- Game weather: Sunny • Temperature: 70 °F (21 °C) • Wind: S 15 mph
- Referee: Riley Johnson (ACC)
- TV announcers (ABC): Anish Shroff (play-by-play), Tom Luginbill (analyst) and Quint Kessenich (sideline)
- ESPN game summary

Game information

First quarter

- (10:43) LA – Jalen Williams 15 yard pass from Levi Lewis, Kenneth Almendares kick (Drive: 8 plays, 68 yards, 4:17; Louisiana 7–0)

Second quarter

- (8:27) LA – Kenneth Almendares 31 yard field goal (Drive: 11 plays, 61 yards, 4:35; Louisiana 10–0)
- (4:33) UTSA – Frank Harris 11 yard rush, Hunter Duplessis kick (Drive: 9 plays, 75 yards, 3:54; Louisiana 10–7)
- (1:21) LA – Kyren Lacy 10 yard pass from Levi Lewis, Kenneth Almendares kick (Drive: 8 plays, 74 yards, 3:06; Louisiana 17–7)

Third quarter

- (14:19) LA – Elijah Mitchell 3 yard rush, Kenneth Almendares kick (Drive: 1 play, 3 yards, 0:04; Louisiana 24–7)
- (10:14) UTSA – Zakhari Franklin 29 yard pass from Frank Harris, Hunter Duplessis kick (Drive: 4 plays, 62 yards, 1:33; Louisiana 24–14)
- (4:09) UTSA – Joshua Cephus 10 yard pass from Frank Harris, Hunter Duplessis kick (Drive: 6 plays, 89 yards, 2:24; Louisiana 24–21)

Fourth quarter

- (13:32) UTSA – Hunter Duplessis 20 yard field goal (Drive: 9 plays, 82 yards, 3:33; Tied 24–24)
- (7:16) LA – Trey Ragas 1 yard rush, Kenneth Almendares kick (Drive: 12 plays, 72 yards, 6:09; Louisiana 31–24)

=== Statistics ===
Statistics	LA	UTSA
First downs	23	27
Plays–yards	69–411	65–431
Rushes–yards	46–265	44–223
Passing yards	146	208
Passing: comp–att–int	12–23–0	13–21–1
Time of possession	32:37	27:23

Team	Category	Player	Statistics
Louisiana	Passing	Levi Lewis	12/22, 146 yards, 2 TD
Louisiana	Rushing	Elijah Mitchell	19 carries, 127 yards, 1 TD
Louisiana	Receiving	Elijah Mitchell	2 receptions, 45 yards
UTSA	Passing	Frank Harris	13/21, 208 yards, 2 TD, 1 INT
UTSA	Rushing	Sincere McCormick	23 carries, 122 yards
UTSA	Receiving	Zakhari Franklin	5 receptions, 115 yards, 1 TD
