= Willie Simmons (American football) =

American football player and coach (born 1980)

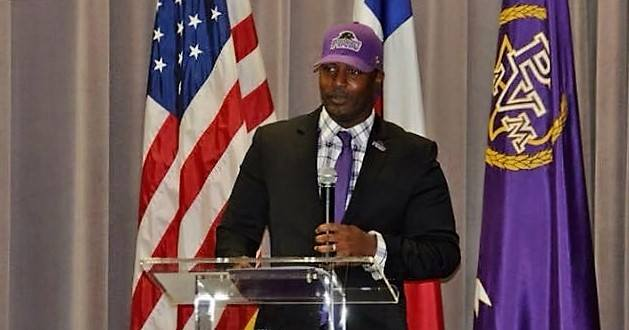
- Simmons at press conference after being named head coach at Prairie View A&M

Current position
- Title: Head coach
- Team: FIU
- Conference: CUSA
- Record: 11–13

Biographical details
- Born: October 12, 1980 (age 46); Tallahassee, Florida, U.S.

Playing career
- 2000–2002: Clemson
- 2003: The Citadel
- 2005: Sioux City Bandits
- Position: Quarterback

Coaching career (HC unless noted)
- 2005: Lincoln HS (FL) (PGC/QB)
- 2006: Clemson (GA)
- 2007–2009: Middle Tennessee (RB)
- 2010: Middle Tennessee (PGC/RB)
- 2011: Middle Tennessee (OC/RB)
- 2012–2014: Alcorn State (OC/RB)
- 2015–2017: Prairie View A&M
- 2018–2023: Florida A&M
- 2024: Duke (RGC/RB)
- 2025–present: FIU

Head coaching record
- Overall: 77–37
- Bowls: 1–1
- Tournaments: 0–1 (NCAA D-I playoffs)

Accomplishments and honors

Championships
- 1 black college national (2023); 1 SWAC

Awards
- SWAC Coach of the Year (2023); 2× AFCA Region 3 Coach of the Year (2022–2023)

Willie Simmons (born October 12, 1980) is an American college football coach and former quarterback. He is the head football coach at Florida International University (FIU), a position he has held since 2025. Simmons previously served as head coach at Florida A&M University (FAMU) from 2018 to 2023, where he led the team to a black college national championship and a Southwestern Athletic Conference (SWAC) title in 2023, and at Prairie View A&M University from 2015 to 2017. As a player, Simmons was an All-American quarterback at James A. Shanks High School and played college football at Clemson University and The Citadel.

== Early life ==
Willie Román Simmons was born on October 12, 1980, in Tallahassee, Florida, to Willie and Phyllis Simmons, the youngest of three children and only son. At James A. Shanks High School in Quincy, Florida, he was an All-American quarterback, ranked the #10 quarterback nationally by Rivals.com. He led the Tigers to their first district championship in 22 years, throwing for 2,505 yards and 32 touchdowns, earning Big Bend Offensive Player of the Year honors. Simmons received over 25 scholarship offers, ultimately signing with Clemson University to play under coach Tommy Bowden.

== Playing career ==
Simmons lettered three years at Clemson (2000–2002), participating in four bowl games (Peach, Gator, Humanitarian, and Tangerine). He graduated with a Bachelor of Science in services marketing in 2002, the fastest graduation by any Clemson football player at the time. After briefly transferring to Florida A&M University in 2003, he was deemed ineligible due to FAMU’s provisional Division I-A status and enrolled at The Citadel. There, he earned All-Southern Conference First Team honors, leading the Bulldogs to a 6–6 record, their first non-losing season in a decade, and defeating Furman, Appalachian State, and Georgia Southern in the same season, a rare feat. In 2005, Simmons played one season for the Sioux City Bandits in the United Indoor Football League, alongside future NFL running back Fred Jackson.

== Coaching career ==
=== Early coaching roles ===
Simmons began coaching in 2005 at Lincoln High School in Tallahassee, serving as pass game coordinator and quarterbacks coach, mentoring future NFL quarterback B.J. Daniels. In 2006, he returned to Clemson as a graduate assistant, working with quarterbacks.

=== Middle Tennessee ===
From 2007 to 2009, Simmons coached running backs at Middle Tennessee under Rick Stockstill. Promoted to pass game coordinator in 2010 and offensive coordinator in 2011, he became one of the youngest FBS coordinators at age 30. In 2011, the Blue Raiders ranked 20th nationally in total offense, leading the Sun Belt Conference in total offense, rushing offense, and third-down conversions.

=== Alcorn State ===
In 2012, Simmons joined Alcorn State as offensive coordinator under Jay Hopson. The Braves improved from a 2–9 record to 4–7 in 2012, defeating SWAC champion Grambling State. In 2013, they finished 9–3, with running back Arnold Walker earning SWAC Co-Offensive Player of the Year honors. In 2014, Alcorn State won the SWAC championship and was named Black College National Champions, with quarterback John Gibbs, Jr., earning SWAC Co-Offensive Player of the Year and Black College Player of the Year. The offense ranked second nationally in scoring offense.

=== Prairie View A&M ===
On December 16, 2014, Simmons was named head coach at Prairie View A&M. In 2015, despite no spring practice due to APR sanctions, the Panthers finished 8–2 (8–1 SWAC), with the nation’s top-scoring offense (44.9 points per game). Simmons achieved three consecutive winning seasons (7–4 in 2016, 6–5 in 2017), a feat accomplished only once in the prior 50 years at PVAMU.

=== Florida A&M ===
On December 12, 2017, Simmons became head coach at Florida A&M, ending a seven-year losing streak with a 6–5 record in 2018. In 2019, FAMU finished 9–2, with quarterback Ryan Stanley named MEAC Offensive Player of the Year. After opting out of 2020 due to COVID-19, FAMU joined the SWAC in 2021, finishing 9–3 and making the FCS playoffs, led by Buck Buchanan Award winner Isaiah Land and All-American safety Markquese Bell. In 2023, Simmons led FAMU to a 12–1 record, winning the SWAC championship, black college national championship, and the Celebration Bowl, earning SWAC Coach of the Year and AFCA Region 3 Coach of the Year honors.

=== Duke ===
In January 2024, Simmons joined the Duke staff under head coach Manny Diaz as the running backs coach. This move followed his resignation as head coach at Florida A&M after leading the program to a 12–1 season and the HBCU national championship in 2023. The position at Duke, an Atlantic Coast Conference (ACC) program, provided Simmons with his first FBS assistant coaching role in over a decade and exposure to the Power Four level.

During the 2024 season, Simmons mentored running back Star Thomas, who ranked among the top rushers in the ACC with 528 yards and four touchdowns. The Blue Devils achieved a 9–3 regular-season record (5–3 in ACC play), marking a strong first year for Diaz and the program's fourth nine-win season since 1941.

=== FIU ===
On December 7, 2024, Florida International University announced the hiring of Simmons as its seventh head football coach, replacing Mike MacIntyre after three consecutive 4–8 seasons. Simmons received a four-year contract. FIU athletic director Scott Carr described Simmons as a "proven winner" who had never experienced a losing season in eight prior years as a head coach. Simmons became the first permanent African American head football coach in FIU history.

In his debut season at FIU, Simmons engineered a significant turnaround for the Panthers. The team finished the regular season with a 7–5 record and a 5–3 mark in Conference USA play, marking FIU's first winning season since 2018 and its first bowl appearance since 2019.

FIU accepted an invitation to the SERVPRO First Responder Bowl, falling 57–20 to UTSA and finishing 7–6 overall.

Simmons received a contract extension shortly after the regular season and became only the second coach in program history (alongside Butch Davis) to achieve a winning record in his debut season.

== Personal life ==
Simmons is married to Shaia René Beckwith, a Florida A&M graduate, and they have six children: Louis III, Amerie, Raven, Shailoh, Wraylon, and Truth. His father, a mechanic, died in a work-related accident in 1987, and his mother, a math teacher, died in 2005 from chronic renal failure. Nicknamed “Shotgun” for his strong arm and quick release, Simmons maintains strong ties to Quincy, Florida.

== Head coaching record ==
Year	Team	Overall	Conference	Standing	Bowl/playoffs	STATS^{#}	Coaches^{°}
Prairie View A&M Panthers (Southwestern Athletic Conference) (2015–2017)
2015	Prairie View A&M	8–2	8–1	2nd (West)			
2016	Prairie View A&M	7–4	7–2	3rd (West)			
2017	Prairie View A&M	6–5	4–3	3rd (West)			
Prairie View A&M:		21–11	19–6				
Florida A&M Rattlers (Mid-Eastern Athletic Conference) (2018–2020)
2018	Florida A&M	6–5	5–2	T–2nd			
2019	Florida A&M	9–2	7–1	1st*		24	25
2020	No team—COVID-19						
Florida A&M Rattlers (Southwestern Athletic Conference) (2021–2023)
2021	Florida A&M	9–3	7–1	2nd (East)	L NCAA Division I First Round	25	24
2022	Florida A&M	9–2	7–1	2nd (East)			23
2023	Florida A&M	12–1	8–0	1st (East)	W Celebration	10	5
Florida A&M:		45–13	32–5	*Could not be named MEAC champions in 2019 due to NCAA sanctions.			
FIU Panthers (Conference USA) (2025–present)
2025	FIU	7–6	5–3	T–4th	L First Responder		
2026	FIU	4–7	2–5				
FIU:		11–13	7–8				
Total:		77–37					
National championship Conference title Conference division title or championship game berth
