= 2025 FIU Panthers football team =

American college football season

2025 FIU Panthers football

First Responder Bowl, L 20–57 vs. UTSA
- Conference: Conference USA
- Record: 7–6 (5–3 CUSA)
- Head coach: Willie Simmons (1st season)
- Offensive coordinator: Nick Coleman (1st season)
- Offensive scheme: Spread
- Defensive coordinator: Jovan Dewitt (4th season)
- Base defense: 3–4
- Home stadium: Pitbull Stadium

2025 Conference USA football standings
	Conf.			Overall
Team	W		L	W		L
Kennesaw State y$	7	–	1	10	–	4
Jacksonville State y	7	–	1	9	–	5
Western Kentucky	6	–	2	9	–	4
Louisiana Tech	5	–	3	8	–	5
FIU	5	–	3	7	–	6
Missouri State	5	–	3	7	–	6
Delaware	4	–	4	7	–	6
Liberty	3	–	5	4	–	8
New Mexico State	2	–	6	4	–	8
Middle Tennessee	2	–	6	3	–	9
Sam Houston	1	–	7	2	–	10
UTEP	1	–	7	2	–	10
Championship: Kennesaw State 19, Jacksonville State 15
$ – Conference champion; y – Championship game participant

The 2025 FIU Panthers football team represented Florida International University (FIU) as a member of Conference USA (CUSA) during the 2025 NCAA Division I FBS football season. The Panthers were led by Willie Simmons in his first year as the head coach. The Panthers played their home games at Pitbull Stadium in Miami.

With a win over Jacksonville State on November 22, 2025, the Golden Panthers clinched bowl eligibility for the first time since 2019. The following week, with a win over Sam Houston, they also clinched their first winning season since 2018.

== Offseason ==
=== Transfers ===
==== Outgoing ====
Player	Position	Destination
Daniel Ogundipe	OL	Albany
Ja'Coby Matthews	WR	Alcorn State
Nazeviah Burris	WR	Arkansas State
Travion Barnes	LB	Baylor
Jaden Williams	DB	Bethune–Cookman
Amari Jones	QB	Bethune–Cookman
Hezekiah Masses	DB	California
LaDarian Paulk	S	Central Missouri
Jamarrion Solomon	DL	Charlotte
Rocky Beers	TE	Colorado State
Jackson Lee	LS	Florida Atlantic
Mike Jackson	WR	Florida Memorial
Eric Rivers	WR	Georgia Tech
Dean Patterson	WR	Georgia Tech
Eddie Walls III	DE	Houston
JaDarious Lee	OL	Kennesaw State
JoJo Evans	S	Louisville
Naeer Jackson	OL	Louisville
Travis Burke	OL	Memphis
Shomari Lawrence	RB	Missouri State
Wyatt Lawson	OL	South Dakota
Jamari Holliman	DB	South Dakota State
John Bock II	OL	Tulane
Ajay Allen	RB	Tulsa
Antonio Ferguson	TE	UAB
Raheim Sexil	DB	UMass
Cole Gustafson	DL	UTEP
Bo Blanchard	OL	Valdosta State
CJ Christian	S	Washington
Marquez Tatum	DL	Unknown
Claude Larkins	DE	Unknown
Reggie Peterson	LB	Unknown
Ming Tjon	OL	Unknown
Rowdy Beers	TE	Unknown
Luby Maurice	WR	Unknown
Antoine Cobb	DL	Unknown
Landon Hale	DB	Unknown
Kejon Owens	RB	Withdrawn
Keyone Jenkins	QB	Withdrawn

==== Incoming ====
Player	Position	Previous school
Reece Larson	WR	Appalachian State
Websley Etienne	S	Arkansas State
Jai-Ayviauynn Celestine	DB	Arizona
L'Cier Luter	DL	Ball State
Johnny Chaney Jr.	LB	Colorado
Trey Wilhoit	P	Florida A&M
Lamont Green Jr.	DE	Florida State
Dante Anderson	DE	Florida State
Anthony Carrie	RB	Georgia Tech
Alex Perry	WR	Hawaii
Joe Pesansky	QB	Holy Cross
Justin Wood	LS	Houston
Demetrius Hill	S	Illinois
Tar'Varish Dawson	WR	Jacksonville State
JoJo Stone	WR	Louisville
Su Agunloye	DL	Marshall
Ajay Allen	RB	Miami (FL)
Antonio Tripp	OL	Miami (FL)
Julius Pierce	OL	Middle Tennessee
Trent Sims	LS	Mississippi Valley State
Justin Cayenne	TE	Pennsylvania
Miguel Cedeno	OL	Rice
Aaron Armitage	DE	Stanford
Dallas Payne	TE	UAB
Tyderick Brown	DB	UAB
Zaire Flournoy	OL	UAB

=== Coaching staff additions ===
Name	New Position	Previous Team	Previous Position	Source
Willie Simmons	Head coach	Duke	Running backs	
Nick Coleman	Offensive coordinator/Quarterbacks	UAB	Quarterbacks	
Kenneth Gilstrap	Special teams/Safeties	UAB	Secondary	
Ryan Smith	Linebackers	Murray State	Defensive coordinator/Safeties	
Frank Ponce	Associate head coach/Tight ends	Appalachian State	Offensive coordinator/Quarterbacks	
Benedick Hyppolite	Running backs	Miami (FL)	Offensive analyst/Running backs	
Edwin Pata	Offensive line	Miami (FL)	Offensive line	
Jelani Berassa	Wide receivers	Youngstown State	Wide receivers	

== Schedule ==
Date	Time	Opponent	Site	TV	Result	Attendance
August 29	7:00 p.m.	Bethune–Cookman*	Pitbull Stadium; Miami, FL	ESPN+	W 42–9	18,034
September 6	12:00 p.m.	at No. 2 Penn State*	Beaver Stadium; University Park, PA	BTN	L 0–34	103,817
September 13	6:00 p.m.	Florida Atlantic*	Pitbull Stadium; Miami, FL (Shula Bowl)	ESPN+	W 38–28	17,638
September 20	6:00 p.m.	Delaware	Pitbull Stadium; Miami, FL	ESPN+	L 16–38	11,705
October 4	3:30 p.m.	at UConn*	Pratt & Whitney Stadium at Rentschler Field; East Hartford, CT	CBSSN	L 10–51	27,310
October 14	8:00 p.m.	at Western Kentucky	Houchens Industries–L. T. Smith Stadium; Bowling Green, KY	ESPNU	W 25–6	12,276
October 21	7:00 p.m.	Kennesaw State	Pitbull Stadium; Miami, FL	ESPN2	L 26–45	12,133
October 29	8:00 p.m.	at Missouri State	Robert W. Plaster Stadium; Springfield, MO	CBSSN	L 21–28	8,754
November 8	3:00 p.m.	at Middle Tennessee	Johnny "Red" Floyd Stadium; Murfreesboro, TN	ESPN+	W 56–30	12,227
November 15	5:00 p.m.	Liberty^{†}	Pitbull Stadium; Miami, FL	ESPN+	W 34–27 ^{OT}	14,167
November 22	3:30 p.m.	Jacksonville State	Pitbull Stadium; Miami, FL	CBSSN	W 27–21	9,504
November 29	1:00 p.m.	at Sam Houston	Shell Energy Stadium; Houston, TX	ESPN+	W 56–16	4,237
December 26	8:00 p.m.	vs. UTSA*	Gerald J. Ford Stadium; Dallas, TX (First Responder Bowl)	ESPN	L 20–57	8,671
*Non-conference game; ^{†}Homecoming; Rankings from AP Poll - Released prior to game; All times are in Eastern time

== Game summaries ==
=== vs. Bethune–Cookman (FCS) ===
Game One – Bethune–Cookman Wildcats (FCS) (0–0) at FIU Panthers (0–0) – Game summary

Quarter	1	2	3	4	Total
Wildcats (FCS)	3	3	0	3	9
Panthers	7	21	7	7	42

at Pitbull Stadium • Miami, FL

- Date: August 29
- Game time: 7:00 p.m. EDT
- Game attendance: 18,034
- Referee: Reed Brotherton
- TV announcers (ESPN+): Steve Goldstein (play-by-play) and Kim Bokamper (analyst)

Game information

First quarter

- BCU – Juan Dominguez 35-yard field goal, 11:46. Wildcats 3–0. Drive: 7 plays, 62 yards, 3:10.
- FIU – Kejon Owens 2-yard run (Robert Czeremcha kick), 8:34. Panthers 7–3. Drive: 7 plays, 67 yards, 3:07.

Second quarter

- FIU – Kejon Owens 6-yard run (Robert Czeremcha kick), 14:49. Panthers 14–3. Drive: 15 plays, 89 yards, 7:04.
- FIU – Keyone Jenkins 6-yard run (Robert Czeremcha kick), 9:43. Panthers 21–3. Drive: 9 plays, 75 yards, 3:36.
- FIU – Devonte Lyons 35-yard run (Robert Czeremcha kick), 5:17. Panthers 28–3. Drive: 5 plays, 70 yards, 2:12.
- BCU – Juan Dominguez 22-yard field goal, 1:29. Panthers 28–6. Drive: 12 plays, 70 yards, 3:48.

Third quarter

- FIU – Keyone Jenkins 4-yard run (Robert Czeremcha kick), 12:44. Panthers 35–6. Drive: 3 plays, 12 yards, 1:00.

Fourth quarter

- BCU – Juan Dominguez 28-yard field goal, 12:12. Panthers 35–9. Drive: 12 plays, 62 yards, 4:32.
- FIU – Anthony Carrie 2-yard run (Robert Czeremcha kick), 7:01. Panthers 42–9. Drive: 10 plays, 76 yards, 5:06.

Statistics	BCU	FIU
First downs	17	28
Plays–yards	69–346	73–456
Rushes–yards	30–105	38–223
Passing yards	241	233
Passing: Comp–Att–Int	23–39–0	22–35–0
Turnovers	1	1
Time of possession	27:59	32:01

Team	Category	Player	Statistics
Bethune–Cookman	Passing	Timmy McClain	18/28, 164 yards
Bethune–Cookman	Rushing	Marqui Johnson	9 carries, 76 yards
Bethune–Cookman	Receiving	Javon Ross	6 receptions, 109 yards
FIU	Passing	Keyone Jenkins	18/30, 187 yards
FIU	Rushing	Kejon Owens	11 carries, 71 yards, 2 TD
FIU	Receiving	Eric Nelson	2 receptions, 47 yards

=== at No. 2 Penn State ===
Game Two – FIU Panthers (1–0) at No. 2 Penn State Nittany Lions (1–0) – Game summary

Quarter	1	2	3	4	Total
Panthers	0	0	0	0	0
No. 2 Nittany Lions	7	3	10	14	34

at Beaver Stadium • University Park, PA

- Date: September 6
- Game time: 12:00 p.m. EDT
- Game weather: Rainy, cloudy, 64 °F (18 °C)
- Game attendance: 103,817
- Referee: Tim O'Dey
- TV announcers (BTN): Guy Haberman (play-by-play), Yogi Roth (analyst), and Rhett Lewis (sideline reporter)

Game information

First quarter

- PSU – Khalil Dinkins 9-yard pass from Drew Allar (Ryan Barker kick), 3:54. Nittany Lions 7–0. Drive: 10 plays, 87 yards, 3:54.

Second quarter

- PSU – Ryan Barker 41-yard field goal, 0:50. Nittany Lions 10–0. Drive: 8 plays, 13 yards, 3:06.

Third quarter

- PSU – Ryan Barker 34-yard field goal, 9:56. Nittany Lions 13–0. Drive: 12 plays, 60 yards, 5:04.
- PSU – Devonte Ross 42-yard pass from Drew Allar (Ryan Barker kick), 4:44. Nittany Lions 20–0. Drive: 5 plays, 88 yards, 2:09.

Fourth quarter

- PSU – Kaytron Allen 67-yard run (Ryan Barker kick) 3:29. Nittany Lions 27–0. Drive: 1 play, 67 yards, 0:11.
- PSU – Nicholas Singleton 5-yard run (Ryan Barker kick), 1:19. Nittany Lions 34–0. Drive: 1 play, 5 yards, 0:03.

Statistics	FIU	PSU
First downs	14	20
Plays–yards	72–290	64–409
Rushes–yards	39–141	31–209
Passing yards	149	200
Passing: comp–att–int	18–33–1	19–33–0
Turnovers	2	0
Time of possession	34:17	25:43

Team	Category	Player	Statistics
FIU	Passing	Keyone Jenkins	15/28, 127 yards, INT
FIU	Rushing	Kejon Owens	15 carries, 78 yards
FIU	Receiving	JoJo Stone	1 reception, 27 yards
Penn State	Passing	Drew Allar	19/33, 200 yards, 2 TD
Penn State	Rushing	Kaytron Allen	16 carries, 144 yards, TD
Penn State	Receiving	Devonte Ross	3 receptions, 61 yards, TD

=== vs. Florida Atlantic (Shula Bowl) ===
Game Three – Florida Atlantic Owls (1–1) at FIU Panthers (1–1) – Game summary

Quarter	1	2	3	4	Total
Owls	7	14	0	7	28
Panthers	7	10	21	0	38

at Pitbull Stadium • Miami, FL

- Date: September 13
- Game time: 6:00 p.m. EDT
- Game weather: Sunny • Temperature: 80 °F (27 °C) • Wind: E at 5 miles per hour (8.0 km/h)
- Game attendance: 17,638
- Referee: Scott Hardin
- TV announcers (ESPN+): Steve Goldstein (play-by-play) and Kim Bokamper (analyst)

Game information

First quarter

- (5:43) FIU – Kejon Owens 4-yard run, Robert Czeremcha kick (Drive: 8 plays, 48 yards, 4:24; FIU 7–0)
- (3:43) FAU – Caden Veltkamp 10-yard run, Garrison Smith kick (Drive: 4 plays, 75 yards, 2:00; Tied 7–7)

Second quarter

- (14:56) FIU – Kejon Owens 1-yard run, Robert Czeremcha kick (Drive: 3 plays, 49 yards, 0:33; FIU 14–7)
- (9:36) FAU – Easton Messer 23-yard pass from Caden Veltkamp, Garrison Smith kick (Drive: 6 plays, 41 yards, 2:16; Tied 14–14)
- (3:32) FIU – Robert Czeremcha 39-yard field goal (Drive: 12 plays, 56 yards, 6:50; FIU 17–14)
- (0:57) FAU – Xavier Terrell 32-yard pass from Caden Veltkamp, Garrison Smith kick (Drive: 8 plays, 75 yards, 2:35; Florida Atlantic 21–17)

Third quarter

- (11:31) FIU – Keyone Jenkins 4-yard run, Robert Czeremcha kick (Drive: 8 plays, 75 yards, 3:29; FIU 24–21)
- (9:04) FIU – Alex Perry 26-yard pass from Keyone Jenkins, Robert Czeremcha kick (Drive: 3 plays, 55 yards, 1:11; FIU 31–21)
- (4:55) FIU – Anthony Carrie 1-yard run, Robert Czeremcha kick (Drive: 5 plays, 85 yards, 2:39; FIU 38–21)

Fourth quarter

- (7:45) FAU – Jarvis Johnson 4-yard blocked punt return, Garrison Smith kick (FIU 38–28)

Statistics	FAU	FIU
First downs	24	17
Plays–yards	82–478	64–408
Rushes–yards	31–135	40–224
Passing yards	343	184
Passing: comp–att–int	33–51–3	18–24–0
Turnovers	3	1
Time of possession	26:05	33:55

Team	Category	Player	Statistics
Florida Atlantic	Passing	Caden Veltkamp	33/50, 343 yards, 2 TD, 3 INT
Florida Atlantic	Rushing	Gemari Sands	14 carries, 105 yards
Florida Atlantic	Receiving	Jayshon Platt	5 receptions, 90 yards
FIU	Passing	Keyone Jenkins	18/24, 184 yards, TD
FIU	Rushing	Kejon Owens	19 carries, 173 yards, 2 TD
FIU	Receiving	Maguire Anderson	5 receptions, 81 yards

=== vs. Delaware ===
Game Four – Delaware Fightin' Blue Hens (2–1) at FIU Panthers (2–1) – Game summary

Quarter	1	2	3	4	Total
Fightin' Blue Hens	3	21	7	7	38
Panthers	7	0	3	6	16

at Pitbull Stadium • Miami, FL

- Date: September 20
- Game time: 6:00 p.m. EDT
- Game weather: Cloudy, 83 °F (28 °C)
- Game attendance: 11,705
- Referee: Rory Bernard
- TV announcers (ESPN+): Steve Goldstein (play-by-play), and Kim Bokamper (analyst)

Game information

First quarter

- DEL – Nate Reed 24-yard field goal, 9:31. Fightin' Blue Hens 3–0. Drive: 12 plays, 68 yards, 5:29.
- FIU – Keyone Jenkins 2-yard run (Robert Czeremcha kick), 3:32. Panthers 7–3. Drive: 3 plays, 54 yards, 0:45.

Second quarter

- DEL – Jo Silver 14-yard run (Nate Reed kick), 11:55. Fightin' Blue Hens 10–7. Drive: 5 plays, 55 yards, 2:13.
- DEL – Nick Laboy 2-yard pass from Nick Minicucci (Nate Reed kick), 4:26. Fightin' Blue Hens 17–7. Drive: 8 plays, 77 yards, 3:01.
- DEL – Kyre Duplessis 68-yard punt return (Nate Reed kick), 2:37. Fightin' Blue Hens 24–7.

Third quarter

- FIU – Robert Czeremcha 35-yard field goal, 9:24. Fightin' Blue Hens 24–10. Drive: 13 plays, 59 yards, 5:27.
- DEL – Nick Laboy 14-yard pass from Nick Minicucci (Nate Reed kick), 2:53. Fightin' Blue Hens 31–10. Drive: 12 plays, 79 yards, 6:33.

Fourth quarter

- FIU – Alex Perry 5-yard pass from Keyone Jenkins (run failed), 12:22. Fightin' Blue Hens 31–16. Drive: 11 plays, 75 yards, 5:31.
- DEL – Viron Ellison Jr. 9-yard pass from Nick Minicucci (Nate Reed kick), 4:45. Fightin' Blue Hens 38–16. Drive: 15 plays, 81 yards, 7:31.

Statistics	DEL	FIU
First downs	24	14
Plays–yards	66–358	69–363
Rushes–yards	31–140	34–160
Passing yards	218	203
Passing: Comp–Att–Int	23–35–1	22–35–2
Turnovers	1	2
Time of possession	30:31	29:29

Team	Category	Player	Statistics
Delaware	Passing	Nick Minicucci	23/35, 218 yards, 3 TD, INT
Delaware	Rushing	Jo Silver	13 carries, 66 yards, TD
Delaware	Receiving	Sean Wilson	7 receptions, 78 yards
FIU	Passing	Keyone Jenkins	22/34, 203 yards, TD, 2 INT
FIU	Rushing	Kejon Owens	15 carries, 74 yards
FIU	Receiving	Alex Perry	5 receptions, 84 yards, TD

=== at UConn ===
Game Five – FIU Panthers (2–2) at UConn Huskies (3–2) – Game summary

Quarter	1	2	3	4	Total
Panthers	0	3	0	7	10
Huskies	14	13	17	7	51

at Pratt & Whitney Stadium at Rentschler Field • East Hartford, CT

- Date: October 4
- Game time: 3:30 p.m. EDT
- Game weather: Sunny • Temperature: 80 °F (27 °C) • Wind: NW at 3 miles per hour (4.8 km/h)
- Game attendance: 27,310
- Referee: Garrett Dickerson
- TV announcers (CBSSN): Alex Del Barrio (play-by-play), Logan Ryan (analyst) and Hailey Sutton (sideline)
- Box Score

Game information

First quarter

- CONN - Skyler Bell 18-yard pass from Joe Fagnano (Chris Freeman kick), 7:38. Huskies 7–0. Drive: 11 plays, 69 yards, 05:14.
- CONN - Cam Edwards 1-yard run (Chris Freeman kick), 2:08. Huskies 14–0. Drive: 4 plays, 65 yards, 01:09.

Second quarter

- CONN - Chris Freeman 43-yard field goal, 10:55. Huskies 17–0. Drive: 7 plays, 23 yards, 04:00.
- FIU - Noah Grant 26-yard field goal, 6:05. Huskies 17–3. Drive: 10 plays, 67 yards, 04:50.
- CONN - Reymello Murphy 61-yard pass from Joe Fagnano (Chris Freeman kick), 0:55. Huskies 24–3. Drive: 2 plays, 55 yards, 00:30.
- CONN - Chris Freeman 36-yard field goal, 0:21. Huskies 27–3. Drive: 5 plays, 22 yards, 00:27.

Third Quarter

- CONN - Victor Rosa 65-yard pass from Joe Fagnano (Chris Freeman kick), 13:22. Huskies 34–3. Drive: 3 plays, 70 yards, 01:36.
- CONN - Chris Freeman 28-yard field goal, 6:46. Huskies 37–3. Drive: 12 plays, 81 yards, 04:52.
- CONN - Skyler Bell 8-yard pass from Joe Fagnano (Chris Freeman kick), 2:56. Huskies 44–3. Drive: 5 plays, 62 yards, 02:21.

Fourth Quarter

- CONN - Oliver Lundberg Coleman 1-yard run (Chris Freeman kick), 9:48. Huskies 51–3. Drive: 3 plays, 2 yards, 01:18.
- FIU - Kejon Owens 2-yard run (Noah Grant kick), 5:46. Huskies 51–10. Drive: 9 plays, 69 yards, 03:59.

Statistics	FIU	CONN
First downs	18	22
Plays–yards	72–304	67–527
Rushes–yards	36–130	33–150
Passing yards	174	377
Passing: Comp–Att–Int	22-36-3	24-34-0
Turnovers	5	1
Time of possession	30:27	29:33

Team	Category	Player	Statistics
FIU	Passing	Joe Pesansky	7/12, 100 yards
FIU	Rushing	Kejon Owens	16 carries, 67 yards, TD
FIU	Receiving	Alex Perry	4 receptions, 32 yards
FIU	Defense	Victor Evans III	8 tackles
UConn	Passing	Joe Fagnano	22/28, 355 yards, 4 TD
UConn	Rushing	Cam Edwards	12 carries, 80 yards, TD
UConn	Receiving	Reymello Murphy	3 receptions, 78 yards, TD
UConn	Defense	Amir Renwick	10 tackles, 1 sack, 1 INT

=== at Western Kentucky ===
Game Six – FIU Panthers (2–3) at Western Kentucky Hilltoppers (5–1) – Game summary

Quarter	1	2	3	4	Total
Panthers	6	13	6	0	25
Hilltoppers	3	3	0	0	6

at Houchens Industries–L. T. Smith Stadium • Bowling Green, KY

- Date: October 14
- Game time: 8:00 p.m. EDT
- Game weather: Sunny • Temperature: 66 °F (19 °C)
- Game attendance: 12,276
- Referee: Douglas Mercer
- TV announcers (ESPNU): Chuckie Kempf (play-by-play) and Darius Walker (analyst)

Game information

First quarter

- (12:37) FIU – Noah Grant 37-yard field goal (Drive: 6 plays, 55 yards, 2:23; FIU 3–0)
- (7:37) FIU – Noah Grant 28-yard field goal (Drive: 5 plays, 87 yards, 2:04; FIU 6–0)
- (3:03) WKU – John Cannon 28-yard field goal (Drive: 9 plays, 55 yards, 4:34; FIU 6–3)

Second quarter

- (14:56) FIU – Noah Grant 37-yard field goal (Drive: 7 plays, 41 yards, 2:59; FIU 9–3)
- (7:57) FIU – Jackson Verdugo 8-yard pass from Keyone Jenkins, Noah Grant kick (Drive: 14 plays, 89 yards, 6:05; FIU 16–3)
- (2:57) FIU – Noah Grant 51-yard field goal (Drive: 5 plays, 5 yards, 3:15; FIU 19–3)
- (0:00) WKU – Jack Cassidy 55-yard field goal (Drive: 7 plays, 32 yards, 0:29; FIU 19–6)

Third quarter

- (2:03) FIU – Kejon Owens 6-yard run (Drive: 12 plays, 75 yards, 5:32; FIU 25–6)

Fourth quarter

No scoring plays

Statistics	FIU	WKU
First downs	21	18
Plays–yards	70–453	64–341
Rushes–yards	39–249	23–116
Passing yards	204	225
Passing: Comp–Att–Int	20–31–0	27–41–3
Turnovers	0	3
Time of possession	34:38	25:22

Team	Category	Player	Statistics
FIU	Passing	Keyone Jenkins	17/25, 184 yards, TD
FIU	Rushing	Kejon Owens	22 carries, 195 yards, TD
FIU	Receiving	Alex Perry	3 receptions, 86 yards
Western Kentucky	Passing	Maverick McIvor	20/31, 159 yards, 3 INT
Western Kentucky	Rushing	Mavis Parrish	9 carries, 74 yards
Western Kentucky	Receiving	Matthew Henry	2 receptions, 58 yards

=== vs. Kennesaw State ===
Game Seven – Kennesaw State Owls (4–2) at FIU Panthers (3–3) – Game summary

Quarter	1	2	3	4	Total
Owls	14	10	7	14	45
Panthers	7	7	3	9	26

at Pitbull Stadium • Miami, FL

- Date: October 21
- Game time: 7:00 p.m. EDT
- Game weather: Cloudy • Temperature: 81 °F (27 °C) • Wind: E 3 mph
- Game attendance: 12,133
- Referee: Larry Clemens
- TV announcers (ESPN2): Clay Matvick (play-by-play) and Chase Daniels (analyst)

Game information

First quarter

- KENN – Amari Odom 2-yard run (Britton Williams kick), 8:25. Owls 7–0. Drive: 7 plays, 80 yards, 3:07.
- KENN – Alexander Diggs 2-yard run (Britton Williams kick), 3:44. Owls 14–0. Drive: 6 plays, 57 yards, 2:12.
- FIU – Anthony Carrie 15-yard run (Noah Grant kick), 0:25. Owls 14–7. Drive: 7 plays, 57 yards, 3:10.

Second quarter

- KENN − Coleman Bennett 76-yard catch from Amari Odom (Britton Williams kick), 14:48. Owls 21−7. Drive: 2 plays, 88 yards, 0:31.
- KENN − Britton Williams 40-yard field goal, 5:04. Owls 24−7. Drive: 13 plays, 51 yards, 4:42.
- FIU − Kejon Owens 43-yard run (Noah Grant kick), 1:49. Owls 24−14. Drive: 8 plays, 75 yards, 3:15.

Third quarter

- FIU − Noah Grant 43-yard field goal, 7:57. Owls 24−17. Drive: 13 plays, 49 yards, 7:03.
- KENN − Christian Moss 70-yard catch from Dexter Williams II (Britton Williams kick), 0:19. Owls 31−17. Drive: 3 plays, 80 yards, 0:53.

Fourth quarter

- FIU − Noah Grant 28-yard field goal, 9:16. Owls 31−20. Drive: 7 plays, 68 yards, 2:14.
- KENN − Dexter Williams II 2-yard run (Britton Williams kick), 2:59. Owls 38−20. Drive: 10 plays, 75 yards, 6:17.
- KENN − Chase Belcher 6-yard run (Britton Williams kick), 1:03, Owls 45−20. Drive: 5 plays, 34 yards, 1:18.
- FIU − Eric Nelson 12-yard catch from Keyone Jenkins (Two-Point Conversion failed), 0:15, Owls 45−26. Drive: 3 plays, 75 yards, 0:48.

Statistics	KENN	FIU
First downs	20	23
Plays–yards	58–498	73–518
Rushes–yards	41–214	37–222
Passing yards	284	296
Passing: Comp–Att–Int	12–17–0	22–36–0
Turnovers	0	0
Time of possession	25:39	34:21

Team	Category	Player	Statistics
Kennesaw State	Passing	Amari Odom	10/15, 205 yards, TD
Kennesaw State	Rushing	Alexander Diggs	11 carries, 69 yards, TD
Kennesaw State	Receiving	Gabriel Benyard	5 receptions, 97 yards
FIU	Passing	Keyone Jenkins	22/36, 296 yards, TD
FIU	Rushing	Kejon Owens	20 carries, 166 yards, TD
FIU	Receiving	Alex Perry	7 receptions, 75 yards

=== at Missouri State ===
Game Eight – FIU Panthers (3–4) at Missouri State Bears (4–3) – Game summary

Quarter	1	2	3	4	Total
Panthers	7	7	0	7	21
Bears	7	7	7	7	28

at Robert W. Plaster Stadium • Springfield, MO

- Date: October 29
- Game time: 8:00 p.m.
- Game weather: Cloudy • Temperature: 47 °F (8 °C) • Wind: N at 15 miles per hour (24 km/h)
- Game attendance: 8,754
- Referee: Reed Brotherton
- TV announcers (CBSSN): Jordan Kent (play-by-play) and Adam Breneman (analyst)

Game information

First quarter

- (8:49) MOST – Shomari Lawrence 3-yard run, Yousef Obeid kick (Drive: 5 plays, 24 yards, 1:46; Missouri State 7-0)
- (1:04) FIU – Dallas Payne 6-yard pass from Keyone Jenkins, Noah Grant kick (Drive: 14 plays, 80 yards, 7:38; Tied 7-7)

Second quarter

- (4:32) MOST – Shomari Lawrence 41-yard run, Yousef Obeid kick (Drive: 6 plays, 68 yards, 2:40; Missouri State 14-7)
- (0:44) FIU – Alex Perry 25-yard pass from Keyone Jenkins, Noah Grant kick (Drive: 11 plays, 75 yards, 3:48; Tied 14-14)

Third quarter

- (6:47) MOST – Jmariyae Robinson 8-yard pass from Jacob Clark, Yousef Obeid kick (Drive: 10 plays, 86 yards, 5:24; Missouri State 21-14)

Fourth quarter

- (8:21) MOST – Jmariyae Robinson 8-yard pass from Jacob Clark, Yousef Obeid kick (Drive: 3 plays, 51 yards, 1:24; Missouri State 28-14)
- (3:29) FIU – JoJo Stone 5-yard pass from Joe Pesansky, Noah Grant kick (Drive: 6 plays, 65 yards, 2:19; Missouri State 28-21)

Statistics	FIU	MOST
First downs	23	18
Plays–yards	71–346	64–369
Rushes–yards	35–115	37–206
Passing yards	231	163
Passing: Comp–Att–Int	22–36–0	16–27–0
Turnovers	2	1
Time of possession	32:01	27:59

Team	Category	Player	Statistics
FIU	Passing	Keyone Jenkins	15/24, 147 yards, 2 TD
FIU	Rushing	Kejon Owens	18 carries, 63 yards
FIU	Receiving	C'quan Jnopierre	3 receptions, 57 yards
Missouri State	Passing	Jacob Clark	16/27, 163 yards, 2 TD
Missouri State	Rushing	Shomari Lawrence	14 carries, 104 yards, 2 TD
Missouri State	Receiving	Makai Cope	2 receptions, 52 yards

=== at Middle Tennessee ===
Game Nine – FIU Panthers (3–5) at Middle Tennessee Blue Raiders (1–7) – Game summary

Quarter	1	2	3	4	Total
Panthers	0	21	13	22	56
Blue Raiders	7	10	7	6	30

at Johnny "Red" Floyd Stadium • Murfreesboro, TN

- Date: November 8
- Game time: 3:00 p.m. EST
- Game attendance: 12,227
- Referee: Rory Bernard
- TV announcers (ESPN+): Jake Rose (play-by-play), Jeremy Kellam (analyst) and Justin Beasley (sideline)

Game information

First quarter

- MTSU – Jekail Middlebrook 48-yard pass from Nicholas Vattiato (Jacob Hathaway kick), 7:32. Blue Raiders 7–0. Drive: 7 plays, 90 yards, 2:51.

Second quarter

- FIU – Joe Pesansky 6-yard run (Noah Grant kick), 13:40. Tied 7–7. Drive: 5 plays, 28 yards, 2:14.
- FIU – JoJo Stone 49-yard pass from Joe Pesansky (Noah Grant kick), 7:17. Panthers 14–7. Drive: 5 plays, 82 yards, 1:55.
- FIU – Kejon Owens 1-yard run (Noah Grant kick), 4:26. Panthers 21–7. Drive: 5 plays, 17 yards, 2:38.
- MTSU – AJ Jones 5-yard pass from Nicholas Vattiato (Jacob Hathaway kick), 1:39. Panthers 21–14. Drive: 8 plays, 65 yards, 2:47.
- MTSU – Jacob Hathaway 48-yard field goal, 0:42. Panthers 21–17. Drive: 6 plays, 27 yards, 0:35.

Third quarter

- FIU – Alex Perry 20-yard pass from Joe Pesansky (pass failed), 10:34. Panthers 27–17. Drive: 9 plays, 74 yards, 4:26.
- MTSU – Myles Butler 5-yard pass from Nicholas Vattiato (Jacob Hathaway kick), 3:12. Panthers 27–24. Drive: 6 plays, 41 yards, 2:43.
- FIU – Dallas Payne 30-yard pass from Joe Pesansky (Noah Grant kick), 2:16. Panthers 34–24. Drive: 4 plays, 75 yards, 0:56.

Fourth quarter

- FIU – Noah Grant 33-yard field goal, 14:44. Panthers 37–24. Drive: 6 plays, 13 yards, 1:03.
- FIU – Alex Perry 18-yard pass from Joe Pesansky (pass failed), 13:35. Panthers 43–24. Drive: 2 plays, 18 yards, 0:51.
- FIU – Kejon Owens 32-yard run (pass failed), 11:16. Panthers 49–24. Drive: 2 plays, 33 yards, 0:54.
- FIU – Anthony Carrie 29-yard run (Noah Grant kick), 9:15. Panthers 56–24. Drive: 3 plays, 47 yards, 1:28.
- MTSU – Cam'Ron Lacy 60-yard pass from Roman Gagliano (pass failed), 0:43. Panthers 56–30. Drive: 1 play, 60 yards, 0:10.

Statistics	FIU	MTSU
First downs	22	18
Plays–yards	66–401	78–364
Rushes–yards	38–144	24–33
Passing yards	257	331
Passing: Comp–Att–Int	17–28–2	33–54–1
Turnovers	2	3
Time of possession	28:27	31:33

Team	Category	Player	Statistics
FIU	Passing	Joe Pesansky	17/28, 257 yards, 4 TD, 2 INT
FIU	Rushing	Kejon Owens	15 carries, 68 yards, 2 TD
FIU	Receiving	Alex Perry	5 receptions, 71 yards, 2 TD
Middle Tennessee	Passing	Nicholas Vattiato	26/37, 242 yards, 3 TD, INT
Middle Tennessee	Rushing	Jekail Middlebrook	8 carries, 30 yards
Middle Tennessee	Receiving	Cam'Ron Lacy	5 receptions, 108 yards, TD

=== vs. Liberty ===
Game Ten – Liberty Flames (4-5) at FIU Panthers (4-5) – Game summary

Quarter	1	2	3	4	OT	Total
Flames	7	14	0	6	0	27
Panthers	7	10	7	3	7	34

at Pitbull Stadium • Miami, FL

- Date: November 15
- Game time: 5:00 p.m. EST
- Game weather: Sunny • Temperature: 79 °F (26 °C)
- Game attendance: 14,167
- Referee: Garrett Dickerson
- TV announcers (ESPN+): Corey Brooks (play-by-play), Alejandro Solana (analyst) and Billy Gill (analyst)

Game information

First quarter

- (8:44) LIB – Donte Lee Jr. 15-yard pass from Ethan Vasko, Jay Billingsley kick (Drive: 11 plays, 71 yards, 4:56; Liberty 7–0)
- (8:44) FIU – Joe Pesansky 6-yard run, Noah Grant kick (Drive: 10 plays, 75 yards, 3:44; Tied 7–7)

Second quarter

- (14:56) LIB – Vaughn Blue 2-yard run, Jay Billingsley kick (Drive: 9 plays, 65 yards, 4:59; Liberty 14–7)
- (10:47) FIU – Kejon Owens 9-yard run, Noah Grant kick (Drive: 11 plays, 80 yards, 4:05; Tied 14–14)
- (6:54) LIB – Evan Dickens 1-yard run, Jay Billingsley kick (Drive: 7 plays, 74 yards, 3:47; Liberty 21–14)
- (1:49) FIU – Noah Grant 39-yard field goal (Drive: 13 plays, 58 yards, 5:01; Liberty 21–17)

Third quarter

- (9:32) FIU – Alex Perry 8-yard pass from Joe Pesansky, Noah Grant kick (Drive: 8 plays, 57 yards, 3:45; FIU 24–21)

Fourth quarter

- (13:25) FIU – Noah Grant 40-yard field goal (Drive: 14 plays, 59 yards, 7:43; FIU 27–21)
- (2:48) LIB – Jay Billingsley 38-yard field goal (Drive: 14 plays, 76 yards, 7:28; FIU 27–24)
- (0:00) LIB – Jay Billingsley 48-yard field goal (Drive: 4 plays, 29 yards, 0:20; Tied 27–27)

Overtime

- (0:00) FIU – Maguire Anderson 7-yard pass from Joe Pesansky, Noah Grant kick (Drive: 6 plays, 25 yards, 0:00; FIU 34–27)

Statistics	LIB	FIU
First downs	25	22
Plays–yards	73–378	73–375
Rushes–yards	41–160	39–169
Passing yards	218	206
Passing: Comp–Att–Int	17–32–2	24–34–0
Turnovers	2	0
Time of possession	29:49	30:11

Team	Category	Player	Statistics
Liberty	Passing	Ethan Vasko	17/31, 218 yards, TD, 2 INT
Liberty	Rushing	Evan Dickens	28 carries, 106 yards, TD
Liberty	Receiving	Donte Lee Jr.	5 receptions, 79 yards, TD
FIU	Passing	Joe Pesansky	24/34, 206 yards, 2 TD
FIU	Rushing	Kejon Owens	18 carries, 84 yards, TD
FIU	Receiving	Alex Perry	8 receptions, 88 yards, TD

=== vs. Jacksonville State ===
Game Eleven – Jacksonville State Gamecocks (7-3) at FIU Panthers (5-5) – Game summary

Quarter	1	2	3	4	Total
Gamecocks	7	7	7	0	21
Panthers	7	0	10	10	27

at Pitbull Stadium • Miami, FL

- Date: November 22
- Game time: 3:30 p.m. EST
- Game attendance: 9,504
- Referee: Douglas Mercer
- TV announcers (CBSSN): Jordan Kent (play-by-play) and Logan Ryan (analyst)

Game information

First quarter

- FIU – Kejon Owens 3-yard run (Noah Grant kick), 7:06. Panthers 7–0. Drive: 8 plays, 68 yards, 3:25.
- JVST – Deondre Johnson 28-yard pass from Caden Creel (Garrison Rippa kick), 5:09. Tied 7–7. Drive: 5 plays, 75 yards, 1:57.

Second quarter

- JVST – Cam Cook 1-yard run (Garrison Rippa kick), 8:06. Gamecocks 14–7. Drive: 6 plays, 16 yards, 2:30.

Third quarter

- FIU – Chad Staley 1-yard pass from Joe Pesansky (Noah Grant kick), 9:33. Tied 14–14. Drive: 10 plays, 75 yards, 5:27.
- JVST – Pearson Baldwin 20-yard pass from Caden Creel (Garrison Rippa kick), 7:14. Gamecocks 21–14. Drive: 1 play, 20 yards, 0:08.
- FIU – Noah Grant 35-yard field goal, 0:35. Gamecocks 21–17. Drive: 6 plays, 44 yards, 3:19.

Fourth quarter

- FIU – Alex Perry 64-yard pass from Joe Pesansky (Noah Grant kick), 12:56. Panthers 24–21. Drive: 2 plays, 68 yards, 0:46.
- FIU – Noah Grant 42-yard field goal, 1:54. Panthers 27–21. Drive: 7 plays, 47 yards, 4:33.

Statistics	JVST	FIU
First downs	23	19
Plays–yards	77–449	69–398
Rushes–yards	46–251	41–202
Passing yards	198	196
Passing: Comp–Att–Int	17–31–0	14–28–2
Turnovers	2	3
Time of possession	28:22	31:38

Team	Category	Player	Statistics
Jacksonville State	Passing	Caden Creel	17/30, 198 yards, 2 TD
Jacksonville State	Rushing	Cam Cook	25 carries, 138 yards, TD
Jacksonville State	Receiving	Deondre Johnson	3 receptions, 49 yards, TD
FIU	Passing	Joe Pesansky	14/28, 196 yards, 2 TD, 2 INT
FIU	Rushing	Kejon Owens	21 carries, 135 yards, TD
FIU	Receiving	Alex Perry	4 receptions, 109 yards, TD

=== at Sam Houston ===
Game Twelve – FIU Panthers (6–5) at Sam Houston Bearkats (2–9) – Game summary

Quarter	1	2	3	4	Total
Panthers	22	6	14	14	56
Bearkats	7	3	0	6	16

at Shell Energy Stadium • Houston, TX

- Date: November 29
- Game time: 1:00 p.m. EST
- Game attendance: 4,237
- Referee: Douglas Mercer
- TV announcers (ESPN+): Matt Pedersen (play-by-play), Jorge Vargas (analyst) and Brooke Kirchhofer (sideline)

Game information

First quarter

- FIU – Dallas Payne 4-yard pass from Keyone Jenkins (Noah Grant kick), 12:46. Panthers 7–0. Drive: 5 plays, 70 yards, 2:07.
- SHSU – Landan Brown 1-yard run (Christian Pavon kick), 10:30. Tied 7–7. Drive: 7 plays, 75 yards, 2:16.
- FIU – Alex Perry 8-yard pass from Keyone Jenkins (Noah Grant kick), 4:06. Panthers 14–7. Drive: 5 plays, 56 yards, 2:49.
- FIU – Alex Perry 35-yard pass from Keyone Jenkins (Kejon Owens run), 1:37. Panthers 22–7. Drive: 3 plays, 64 yards, 1:01.

Second quarter

- SHSU – Christian Pavon 34-yard field goal, 13:00. Panthers 22–10. Drive: 8 plays, 59 yards, 3:33.
- FIU – Noah Grant 29-yard field goal, 7:29. Panthers 25–10. Drive: 4 plays, -4 yards, 1:27.
- FIU – Noah Grant 24-yard field goal, 0:16. Panthers 28–10. Drive: 8 plays, 76 yards, 2:39.

Third quarter

- FIU – Keyone Jenkins 6-yard run (Noah Grant kick), 6:04. Panthers 35–10. Drive: 6 plays, 89 yards, 2:33.
- FIU – Anthony Carrie 1-yard run (Noah Grant kick), 0:44. Panthers 42–10. Drive: 7 plays, 36 yards, 3:16.

Fourth quarter

- SHSU – Grady O'Neill 8-yard pass from Landyn Locke (pass failed), 7:16. Panthers 42–16. Drive: 11 plays, 53 yards, 4:57.
- FIU – Sterling Joseph 61-yard run (Noah Grant kick), 3:08. Panthers 49–16. Drive: 1 play, 61 yards, 0:10.
- FIU – Sterling Joseph 31-yard run (Noah Grant kick), 1:51. Panthers 56–16. Drive: 2 plays, 50 yards, 0:34.

Statistics	FIU	SHSU
First downs	24	19
Plays–yards	64–594	71–359
Rushes–yards	40–303	38–196
Passing yards	291	163
Passing: Comp–Att–Int	15–24–1	16–33–2
Turnovers	1	4
Time of possession	30:41	29:19

Team	Category	Player	Statistics
FIU	Passing	Keyone Jenkins	15/24, 291 yards, 3 TD, INT
FIU	Rushing	Kejon Owens	15 carries, 124 yards
FIU	Receiving	Alex Perry	7 receptions, 140 yards, 2 TD
Sam Houston	Passing	Landyn Locke	14/30, 121 yards, TD, 2 INT
Sam Houston	Rushing	Elijah Green	11 carries, 98 yards
Sam Houston	Receiving	Grady O'Neill	8 receptions, 70 yards, TD

=== vs. UTSA (First Responder Bowl) ===
Game Thirteen - 2025 SERVPRO First Responder Bowl
FIU Panthers (7–5) vs. UTSA Roadrunners (6–6) – Game summary

Quarter	1	2	3	4	Total
Panthers	14	0	6	0	20
Roadrunners	14	17	9	17	57

at Gerald J. Ford Stadium • Dallas, TX

- Date: December 26
- Game time: 8:00 p.m. EST
- Game weather: Clear • Temperature: 82 °F (28 °C) • Wind: SSW at 5 mph (8.0 km/h)
- Game attendance: 8,671
- Referee: Steve Robinson
- TV announcers (ESPN): Anish Shroff (play-by-play), Andre Ware (analyst) and Paul Carcaterra (sideline)

Game information

First quarter

- FIU – Kyle McNeal 19-yard pass from Joe Pesansky (Noah Grant kick), 12:17. Panthers 7–0. Drive: 6 plays, 54 yards, 2:37.
- FIU – Maguire Anderson 97-yard punt return (Noah Grant kick), 9:26. Panthers 14–0.
- UTSA – Will Henderson III 2-yard run (Michael Petro kick), 6:36. Panthers 14–7. Drive: 6 plays, 75 yards, 2:50.
- UTSA – Will Henderson III 40-yard pass from Owen McCown (Michael Petro kick), 4:15. Tied 14–14. Drive: 3 plays, 52 yards, 1:18.

Second quarter

- UTSA – Michael Petro 37-yard field goal, 14:55. Roadrunners 17–14. Drive: 7 plays, 39 yards, 2:43.
- UTSA – Devin McCuin 23-yard pass from Owen McCown (Michael Petro kick), 9:42. Roadrunners 24–14. Drive: 9 plays, 67 yards, 3:32.
- UTSA – A'Marion Peterson 10-yard run (Michael Petro kick), 1:17. Roadrunners 31–14. Drive: 11 plays, 66 yards, 3:57.

Third quarter

- UTSA – Will Henderson III 5-yard run (Michael Petro kick), 8:25. Roadrunners 38–14. Drive: 6 plays, 47 yards, 2:32.
- FIU – Dallas Payne 22-yard pass from Joe Pesansky (pass failed), 4:13. Roadrunners 38–20. Drive: 10 plays, 75 yards, 4:12.
- UTSA – Ahamad Chapman Defensive PAT Conversion, 4:13. Roadrunners 40–20.

Fourth quarter

- UTSA – Patrick Overmyer 34-yard pass from Owen McCown (Michael Petro kick), 14:20. Roadrunners 47–20. Drive: 3 plays, 51 yards, 1:25.
- UTSA – Michael Petro 36-yard field goal, 6:02. Roadrunners 50–20. Drive: 5 plays, 32 yards, 1:53.
- UTSA – Bryson Donnell 12-yard run (Jaffer Murphy kick), 1:55. Roadrunners 57–20. Drive: 6 plays, 30 yards, 2:32.

Statistics	FIU	UTSA
First downs	22	25
Plays–yards	78–255	71–481
Rushes–yards	29–79	40–186
Passing yards	176	295
Passing: Comp–Att–Int	21–49–2	18–31–0
Turnovers	2	0
Time of possession	28:54	31:06

Team	Category	Player	Statistics
FIU	Passing	Joe Pesansky	11/31, 102 yards, 2 TD, INT
FIU	Rushing	Kejon Owens	8 carries, 36 yards
FIU	Receiving	Jojo Stone	4 receptions, 28 yards
UTSA	Passing	Owen McCown	18/28, 295 yards, 3 TD
UTSA	Rushing	Will Henderson III	14 carries, 59 yards, 2 TD
UTSA	Receiving	Devin McCuin	6 receptions, 73 yards, TD
