= Servpro =

American cleanup services franchising company

Servpro Industries, LLC
- Company type: Private, Franchise
- Industry: Service
- Founded: 1967
- Founder: Ted and Doris Isaacson
- Headquarters: Gallatin, Tennessee, USA
- Number of locations: 2,400+
- Key people: John Sooker, CEO; Tanner Owen, CFO; Vince Brockman, Chief Legal Officer; Joy Wald, CIO; Rob Rajkowski, CMO
- Number of employees: 450 (Corporate), 2,400+ Franchises
- Website: servpro.com

Servpro is a franchisor of fire and water cleanup and restoration franchises in the United States and Canada. The franchise system provides localized services and large-scale disaster recovery. It is headquartered in Gallatin, Tennessee.

== History ==
Ted and Doris Isaacson launched Servpro Industries in 1967 as a painting business in Sacramento, California. With a background in cleaning and restoration, they transformed the company into a franchisor of cleanup and restoration specialists. After selling its first franchise in 1969, Servpro continued to grow, acquiring the Bristol-Myers Domesticare Division and its 175 franchises in 1979, and developing a highly regarded national franchise.

Servpro relocated its corporate headquarters from Sacramento to Gallatin, Tennessee in 1988. At the time of the relocation, Servpro consisted of 647 franchises. The company sold its 1,000th franchise in 2000.

To accommodate their growth, the Servpro headquarters moved to a facility of 140,000 square feet (13,000 m^{2}) in 2005, which was expanded to 200,000 square feet (19,000 m^{2}) in 2014. The Tennessean has listed Servpro as one of Tennessee's top workplaces eight times since 2015, including 2024.

Servpro consists of 2.250 franchises in the United States and Canada (as of 2024).

In March 2019, The Blackstone Group acquired a majority stake in Servpro Industries, LLC, for an amount reportedly exceeding US$1 billion according to the Wall Street Journal. The Isaacson family reinvested and maintains minority ownership.

== Services ==
Servpro provides residential and commercial water, fire, and mold cleanup and restoration services. Many franchises offer specialty services, such as biohazard cleanup, document restoration, electronics restoration, dry cleaning, and construction.

== Large-scale disaster recovery ==
Despite the franchise structure of numerous relatively small entities, Servpro has the capacity and organizational competence to respond to large-scale disasters, including major corporate and government contracts after Hurricane Katrina in 2005 and Hurricane Ike in 2008. Servpro was contracted for drainage and restoration by government, commercial entities and numerous households after the 2010 Tennessee floods. Similarly, Servpro was involved in restoration and reconstruction after Hurricane Sandy in 2012.

== See also ==
- First Responder Bowl
