= TicketCity =

- Company type: Private
- Founded: Austin, Texas (1990)
- Founders: Randy Cohen
- Headquarters: Austin, TX
- Area served: Worldwide

TicketCity is a privately held American ticket broker and online marketplace headquartered in Austin, Texas.

== History ==
Randy Cohen founded TicketCity in March 1990 using the experience he gained selling tickets on the secondary market in 1988 while attending the University of Texas at Austin.

On August 7, 1998, TicketCity became one of the first online ticket brokers.

In 2000, TicketCity acquired SoldOut.com for $250,000 which expanded its customer base from Texas to the East Coast.

In 2002, TicketCity acquired Ticketsupfront.com expanding its access in the Midwest.

On May 21, 2019, Fandeavor announced that they had been acquired by TicketCity.

== Legal issues and customer complaints ==
On August 5, 2008, Texas Attorney General Greg Abbott charged TicketCity with violating the state's Deceptive Trade Practices Act. Customers who attempted to buy tickets for the Beijing Summer Olympic Games complained that TicketCity did not honor their 200 percent refund when they could not deliver the tickets. On June 17, 2011, TicketCity and Abbot agreed to a settlement, where there was no admission of liability and no payment of penalties. In order to resolve the State's legal action, TicketCity was required to post a 120-day notice on their website, telling customers who purchased undelivered tickets to the opening ceremonies how they could apply for the 200 percent refunds that it originally promised.
