= Gerald J. Ford Stadium =

American football stadium in Dallas, Texas

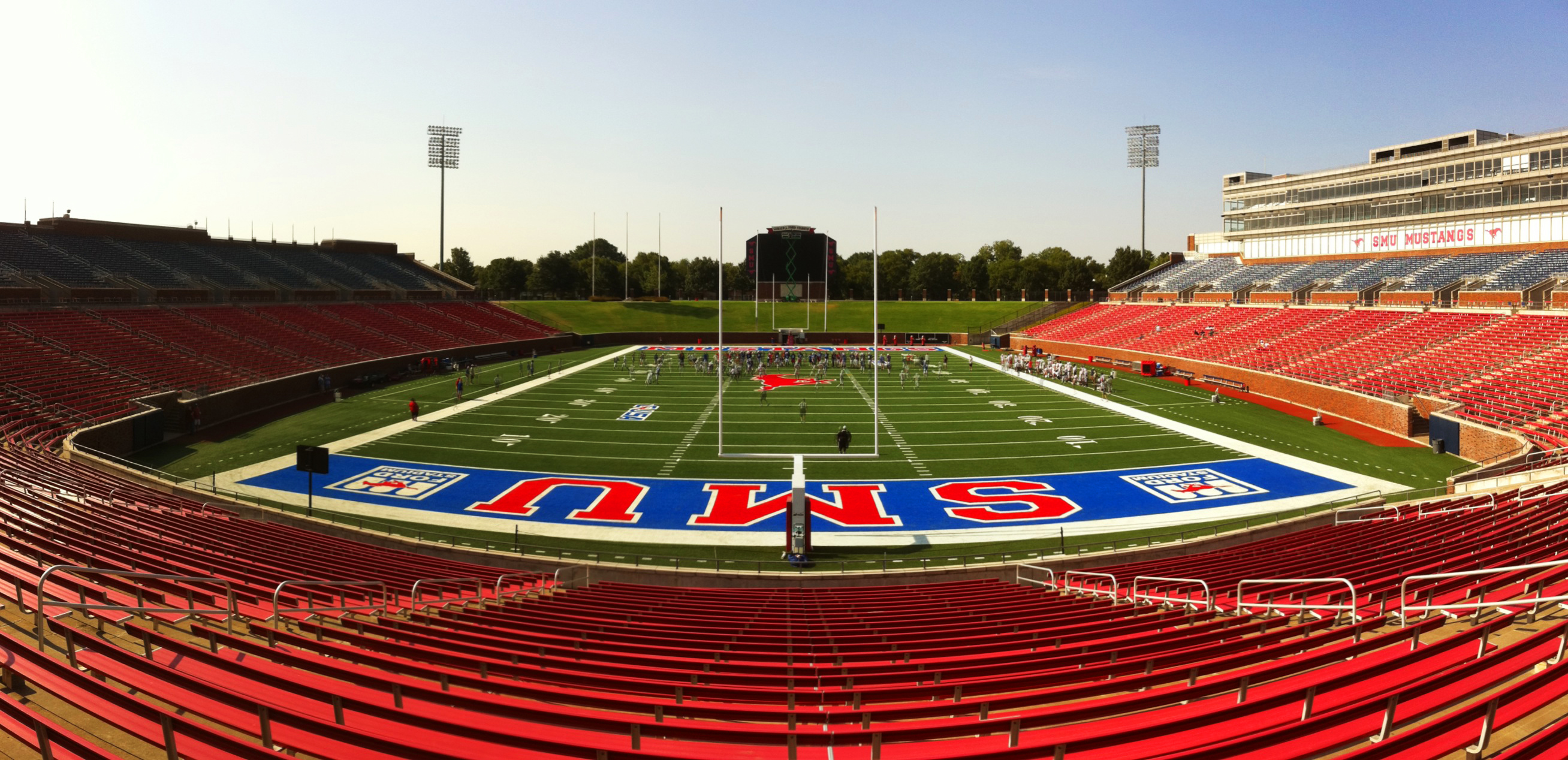

- Location in Texas Location in the United States
- Location: 5801 Bush Avenue; Dallas, TX 75205
- Coordinates: 32°50′11.92″N 96°47′2.38″W
- Owner: Southern Methodist University
- Operator: Southern Methodist University
- Capacity: 33,200
- Surface: FieldTurf (2003–2016); Shaw Sports Turf (2016–2024); Bermuda Grass (2000–2002, 2025–present)
- Public transit: Dallas Area Rapid Transit; Red Line; Orange Line; Blue Line at SMU/Mockingbird

Construction
- Groundbreaking: September 10, 1999
- Opened: September 2, 2000
- Cost: $42 million ($78.5 million in 2025 dollars)
- Architect: Ellerbe Becket
- General contractor: Huber, Hunt & Nichols

Tenants
- SMU Mustangs (NCAA) (2000–present); Armed Forces Bowl (NCAA) (2010–2011); First Responder Bowl (NCAA) (2019–present)

Gerald J. Ford Stadium is a stadium in Dallas, Texas. The stadium is owned by Southern Methodist University (SMU) and is used primarily for games played by the SMU Mustangs football team.

== About Gerald J. Ford Stadium ==
The stadium is named after Gerald J. Ford, a billionaire banker who provided most of the funding for its construction.

Outside the northeast corner of the stadium is Doak Walker Plaza, honoring the former Heisman Trophy winner and SMU's greatest football star. The plaza includes a life-sized replica of the Doak Walker Award trophy, awarded annually to the nation's top college football running back. The northwest corner is connected to the Loyd All-Sports Center, which contains locker, training, and office space for SMU Athletics.

== History ==
The building stands on the site of the former Ownby Stadium, the school's previous on-campus football stadium that had been used since 1926. Ownby was demolished starting in late October 1998 in order to clear the land designated for the new stadium. Ford Stadium opened on September 2, 2000, with a football game against the University of Kansas.

On September 24, 2022, the regular season attendance record was set at Gerald J. Ford Stadium when 35,481 people watched the TCU Horned Frogs face off against the SMU Mustangs in the Battle for the Iron Skillet. The overall attendance record is set at 36,742 for the 2010 Armed Forces Bowl between SMU and the Army Black Knights.

== Expansion ==
The north-south oriented stadium is bowl-shaped, originally standing on three sides (west, east, and north). The stadium is theoretically expandable to 45,000 seats by enclosing the horseshoe on the south end.

=== Renovations ===
In 2012, SMU Mustang Athletics announced the construction of additional luxury suites, as well as the upgrading of infrastructure to the Paul B. Loyd, Jr. All-Sports Center to allow access to designated outdoor seating areas in the stadium. Construction was completed prior to the start of the 2013 season.

On July 26, 2016, SMU officials announced plans for an upcoming facilities project that will include a new indoor performance center for the Mustangs football team, as well as an outdoor natural grass football practice field. The additions are part of the initial phase of SMU's $150 million comprehensive facilities upgrade.

On December 2, 2022, SMU broke ground on the Garry Weber Endzone Complex, a new, $100 million dollar state-of-the-art facility for the school's football team. The complex, named after Garry Weber, an accomplished entrepreneur, investor, philanthropist and former SMU football player, will include a new weight room, training facilities, meeting rooms, and offices for the football program. The complex was expected to be completed in time for the start of 2024 football season, and the expansion was completed and dedicated on September 6, 2024.

== Attendance records ==
Rank	Attendance	Date	Game Result
1	36,742	December 30, 2010	SMU 14, Army 16
2	35,569	September 24, 2022	SMU 34, TCU 42
3	35,481	September 24, 2010	SMU 24, 4 TCU 41
4	35,074	November 1, 2025	SMU 26, 10 Miami 20
5	34,879	September 28, 2024	SMU 42, Florida State 16
6	34,852	September 6, 2025	17 SMU 45, Baylor 48
7	34,845	October 4, 2025	SMU 31, Syracuse 18
8	34,820	September 20, 2014	SMU 6, 6 Texas A&M 58
9	34,790	August 30, 2013	SMU 23, Texas Tech 41
10	34,749	September 5, 2009	SMU 31, Stephen F. Austin 23
11	34,689	September 4, 2004	SMU 13, Texas Tech 27
12	34,648	November 2, 2024	20 SMU 48, 18 Pittsburgh 25
13	34,438	November 16, 2024	14 SMU 38, Boston College 28
14	33,178	November 30, 2024	9 SMU 38, California 6
15	33,168	September 21, 2024	SMU 66, TCU 42
16	33,044	August 30, 2025	16 SMU 42, East Texas A&M 13
17	32,267	September 2, 2000	SMU 31, Kansas 17
18	32,074	September 4, 2015	SMU 21, 4 Baylor 56
19	32,016	September 15, 2012	SMU 3, Texas A&M 48
20	32,000	October 22, 2016	SMU 38, 11 Houston 16

== Gallery ==
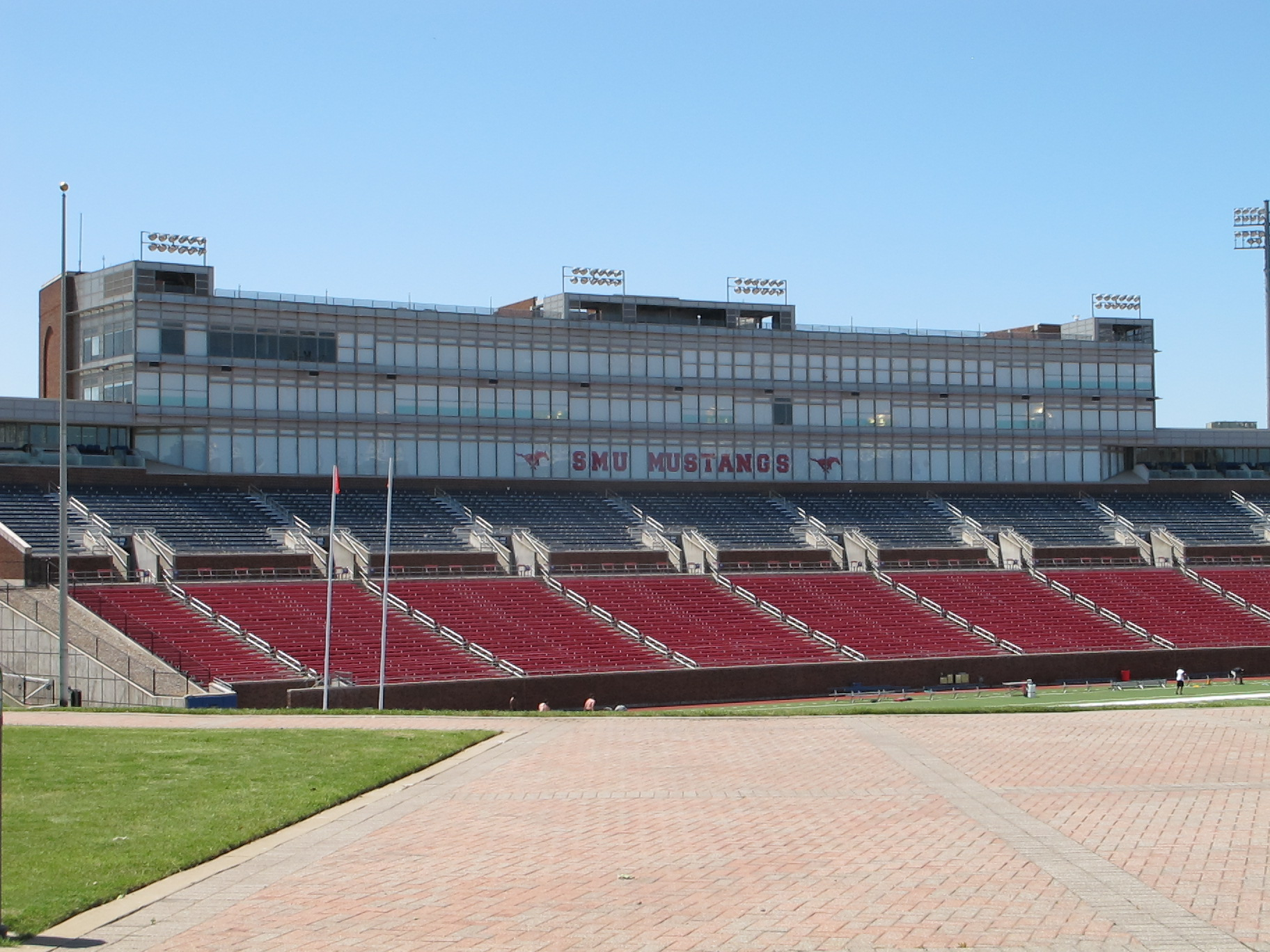
Home side, 2016

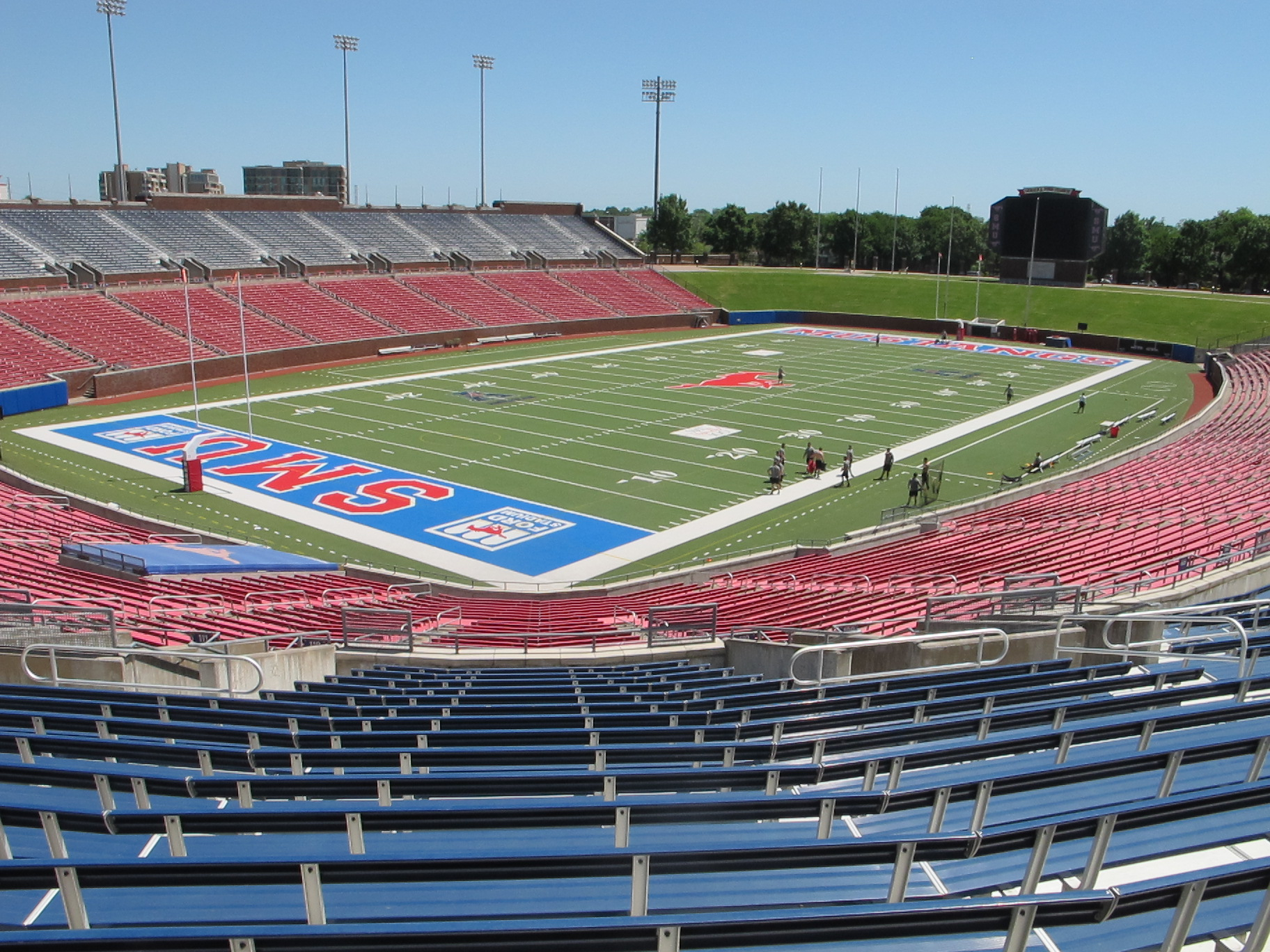
Wide shot, 2016

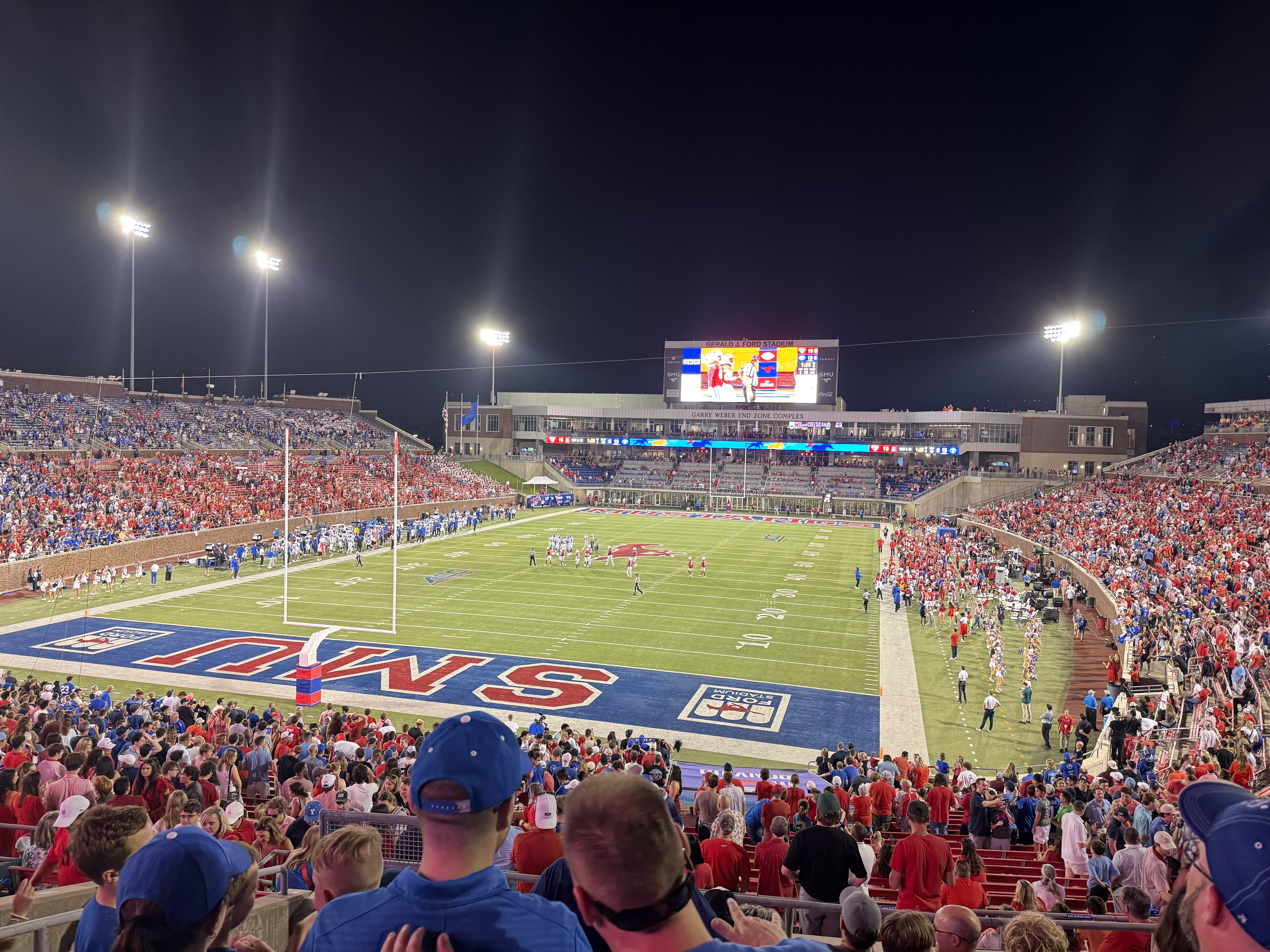
New end zone, 2024

== See also ==
- List of NCAA Division I FBS football stadiums

Preceded by Columbus Crew Stadium; Columbus, OH	Host of the College Cup; 2002	Succeeded by Columbus Crew Stadium; Columbus, OH
Preceded by Spartan Stadium	Host of the Women's College Cup; 2001	Succeeded by Mike A. Myers Stadium
