= List of college bowl games =

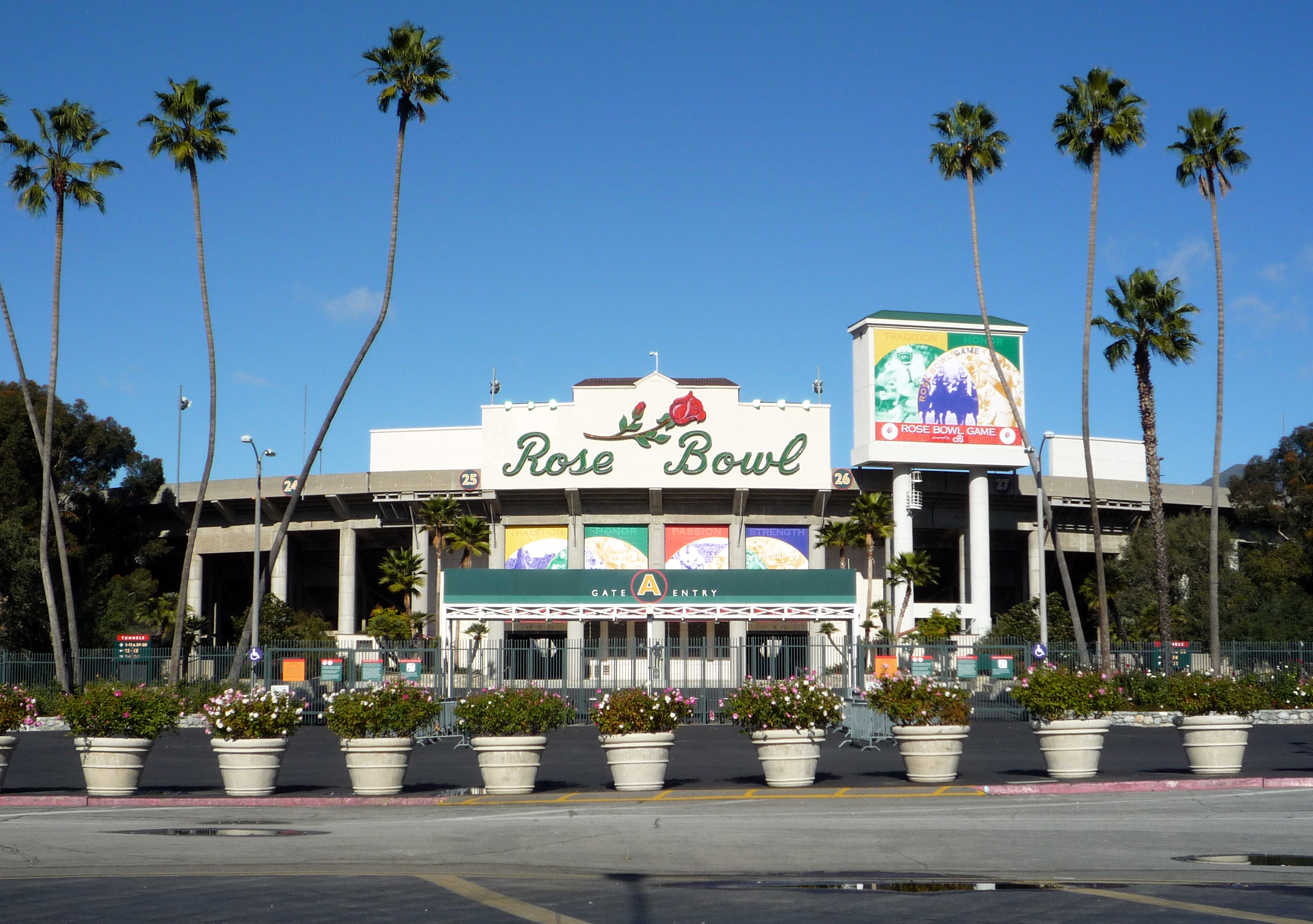
The Rose Bowl Game, played at Rose Bowl stadium (shown), is the oldest operating bowl game—first played in 1902, it has been played annually since 1916.

This is a list of college football bowl games, including those proposed and defunct. Six bowl games are part of the College Football Playoff, a selection system that creates bowl matchups involving twelve of the top-ranked teams in the NCAA Division I Football Bowl Subdivision (FBS). There are also a number of other college football postseason invitationals, as well as several all-star games.

For nearly a century, bowl games were the purview of only the very best teams, but a steady proliferation of new bowl games required more teams, with 70 participating teams by the 2010–11 bowl season, then 80 participating teams by the 2015–16 bowl season. As a result, the NCAA has steadily relaxed the criteria for bowl eligibility. Teams with a non-winning record (6–6) were allowed starting in 2010. Requirements were further reduced to allow teams with outright losing records (5–7) to be invited since 2012, with the team with the best Academic Progress Rate score (among teams with 5–7 records) to be chosen first. While inviting teams without winning records to bowl games has become more commonplace, there were several losing teams who played in bowl games before the last decade's changes in bowl eligibility: 1946 Gator Bowl, South Carolina (2–3–3); 1963 Sun Bowl, SMU (4–6); 1970 Tangerine Bowl, William & Mary (5–6); and the 2001 New Orleans Bowl, North Texas (5–6). For the 2016–17 bowl season, 25% of the bowl participants (20 teams) did not have a winning record.

The tables (College Football Playoff games, Other current Division I FBS bowl games) reflect changes for the 2022–23 bowl season.

Bowl games are not limited to the Bowl Subdivision; teams in the three lower divisions of the NCAA—the Football Championship Subdivision (FCS), Division II, and Division III—are also allowed to participate in bowl games. The playoff structure in those three divisions discourages most high-caliber teams from participating in bowl games, as teams would rather contest for their division's national championship than play in a bowl game. The same basic guidelines for bowl eligibility apply for those contests. As of 2017, one bowl game (the Celebration Bowl) exists for FCS, four bowls serve Division II, and ten exist for teams in Division III (not including the Stagg Bowl, which is the name for the NCAA Division III Football Championship game).

Community college bowl games, not sanctioned by the NCAA, are also listed.

== College Football Playoff games ==
Six major bowl games, known as the New Year's Six, rotate the hosting of the two semifinal games which determine the teams that play in the final College Football Playoff National Championship game. The New Year's Six includes six of the ten oldest bowl games (missing the Sun, Gator, Citrus and Liberty bowls), continuing their original history of pitting the very best teams in the country against each other. These six games focus on the top 12 teams in the rankings, with only five teams ranked lower than 12th (all five were still ranked in the top 20) having ever played in the New Year's Six since the College Football Playoff system was inaugurated.

Name	First game	Venue (permanent seating)	City	Most recent per team payout (+ revenue pool)	Title sponsor	Previous name(s)
Rose Bowl Game	1902 (annual since 1916)	Rose Bowl (92,542)	Pasadena, California*	$4 million for Quarterfinals	Prudential	Tournament East-West football game; Rose Bowl, Rose Bowl Game presented by: AT&T^, Sony PlayStation 2^, Citi^, Vizio^, Northwestern Mutual^, Capital One^
Orange Bowl	1935	Hard Rock Stadium (64,767)	Miami Gardens, Florida	$6 million for Semifinals	Capital One	Orange Bowl, FedEx Orange Bowl, Discover Orange Bowl
Sugar Bowl	1935	Caesars Superdome (73,208)	New Orleans, Louisiana†	$4 million for Quarterfinals	Allstate	Sugar Bowl, USF&G Sugar Bowl, Nokia Sugar Bowl
Cotton Bowl Classic	1937	AT&T Stadium (80,000)	Arlington, Texas	$6 million for Semifinals	Goodyear	Cotton Bowl, Mobil Cotton Bowl, Cotton Bowl, Southwestern Bell Cotton Bowl Classic, SBC Cotton Bowl Classic, AT&T Cotton Bowl Classic
Peach Bowl	1968	Mercedes-Benz Stadium (71,000)	Atlanta, Georgia	$4 million for Quarterfinals	Chick-fil-A	Peach Bowl, Chick-fil-A Peach Bowl, Chick-fil-A Bowl
Fiesta Bowl	1971	State Farm Stadium (63,400)	Glendale, Arizona	$4 million for Quarterfinals	Vrbo	Fiesta Bowl, Sunkist Fiesta Bowl, Fiesta Bowl, IBM OS/2 Fiesta Bowl, Tostitos Fiesta Bowl, Vizio Fiesta Bowl, BattleFrog Fiesta Bowl, PlayStation Fiesta Bowl

^ The Rose Bowl did not add a sponsor to its name until the 1998 season. Unlike other bowls, which give the sponsor's name precedence ahead of the bowl's name (effectively changing the title of the game), the Rose Bowl adds the sponsor as "presented by", after the words Rose Bowl.
* Two-time move, due to World War II travel restrictions after the attack on Pearl Harbor moving the 1942 game to Duke Stadium in Durham, NC, as well as the COVID-19 pandemic moving the 2021 game to AT&T Stadium in Arlington, TX.
† One-time move, due to damage to the Superdome from Hurricane Katrina, moving the 2006 game to the Georgia Dome in Atlanta, GA.

== Other current Division I FBS bowl games ==
Besides the six bowl games that are part of the College Football Playoff, there are a number of other postseason invitationals. Generally, two conferences will agree to send teams of a particular standing to a game beforehand. For instance, the Rose Bowl traditionally features the Big Ten and Pac-12 conference champions. Generally, the payout to the participating teams in a bowl game is closely correlated to its prestige. By comparison, each of the former BCS bowls (including the national championship game) had a payout of $18 million.

Name	Season started	Venue (permanent seating)	City	Total payout	Title sponsor(s)	Previous name(s)
Sun Bowl	1934	Sun Bowl (51,500)	El Paso, Texas	$4,550,000	Old El Paso (Note: Old El Paso is a brand of Tex-Mex style foods produced by General Mills.)	Sun Bowl, John Hancock Sun Bowl, John Hancock Bowl, Norwest Bank Sun Bowl, Norwest Corporation Sun Bowl, Wells Fargo Sun Bowl, Vitalis Sun Bowl, Brut Sun Bowl, Hyundai Sun Bowl, Tony the Tiger Sun Bowl
Gator Bowl	1945	EverBank Stadium (76,867)	Jacksonville, Florida	$5,350,000	TaxSlayer	Gator Bowl, Mazda Gator Bowl, Outback Gator Bowl, Toyota Gator Bowl, Konica Minolta Gator Bowl, Progressive Gator Bowl, TaxSlayer.com Gator Bowl, TaxSlayer Bowl
Citrus Bowl	1946	Camping World Stadium (60,219)	Orlando, Florida	$8,224,578	None	Tangerine Bowl, Florida Citrus Bowl, CompUSA Florida Citrus Bowl, Ourhouse.com Florida Citrus Bowl, Capital One Florida Citrus Bowl, Capital One Bowl, Buffalo Wild Wings Citrus Bowl, Citrus Bowl presented by Overton's, Vrbo Citrus Bowl, Cheez-It Citrus Bowl (Note: Cheez-It is a brand of cheese crackers produced by Kellogg's.)
Liberty Bowl	1959	Simmons Bank Liberty Stadium (58,325)	Memphis, Tennessee	$4,700,000	AutoZone	Liberty Bowl, St. Jude Liberty Bowl, AXA Liberty Bowl
Independence Bowl	1976	Independence Stadium (53,000)	Shreveport, Louisiana	$2,200,000	Radiance Technologies	Independence Bowl, Poulan Independence Bowl, Poulan Weed Eater Independence Bowl, Sanford Independence Bowl, MainStay Independence Bowl, PetroSun Independence Bowl, AdvoCare V100 Independence Bowl, AdvoCare V100 Bowl, Duck Commander Independence Bowl, Camping World Independence Bowl, Walk-On's Independence Bowl
Holiday Bowl	1978	Snapdragon Stadium (35,000)	San Diego, California	$6,532,700	None	Holiday Bowl, Sea World Holiday Bowl, Thrifty Car Rental Holiday Bowl, Plymouth Holiday Bowl, Culligan Holiday Bowl, Pacific Life Holiday Bowl, Bridgepoint Education Holiday Bowl, National University Holiday Bowl, National Funding Holiday Bowl, San Diego County Credit Union Holiday Bowl, DIRECTV Holiday Bowl, Trust & Will Holiday Bowl
ReliaQuest Bowl	1986	Raymond James Stadium (65,908)	Tampa, Florida	$6,666,667	ReliaQuest	Hall of Fame Bowl, Outback Bowl
Cactus Bowl	1989	Mountain America Stadium (53,599)	Tempe, Arizona	$1,625,560	None	Copper Bowl, Domino's Pizza Copper Bowl, Weiser Lock Copper Bowl, Insight.com Bowl, Insight Bowl, Buffalo Wild Wings Bowl, TicketCity Cactus Bowl, Motel 6 Cactus Bowl, Cheez-It Bowl, Guaranteed Rate Bowl, Rate Bowl
Pop-Tarts Bowl (Note: Pop-Tarts is a brand of toaster pastries produced by Kellogg's.)	1990	Camping World Stadium (60,219)	Orlando, Florida	$6,071,760	Pop-Tarts	Sunshine Classic, Blockbuster Bowl, Carquest Bowl, MicronPC Bowl, MicronPC.com Bowl, Visit Florida Tangerine Bowl, Mazda Tangerine Bowl, Champs Sports Bowl, Russell Athletic Bowl, Camping World Bowl, Cheez-It Bowl
Las Vegas Bowl	1992	Allegiant Stadium (65,000)	Paradise, Nevada	$2,900,000	None	Las Vegas Bowl, Las Vegas Bowl presented by Reno Air, EA Sports Las Vegas Bowl, Sega Sports Las Vegas Bowl, Pioneer PureVision Las Vegas Bowl, Pioneer Las Vegas Bowl, MAACO Bowl Las Vegas, Royal Purple Las Vegas Bowl, Las Vegas Bowl presented by GEICO, Mitsubishi Las Vegas Bowl, SRS Distribution Las Vegas
Alamo Bowl	1993	Alamodome (65,000)	San Antonio, Texas	$8,252,740	Valero	Builders Square Alamo Bowl, Sylvania Alamo Bowl, Alamo Bowl Presented By MasterCard, MasterCard Alamo Bowl, Alamo Bowl
Famous Idaho Potato Bowl	1997	Albertsons Stadium (37,000)	Boise, Idaho	$800,000	Idaho Potato Commission (Note: "Famous Idaho Potato" is an advertising slogan and trademark of the Idaho Potato Commission.)	Sports Humanitarian Bowl, Humanitarian Bowl, Crucial.com Humanitarian Bowl, MPC Computers Bowl, Roady's Humanitarian Bowl, uDrove Humanitarian Bowl
Music City Bowl	1998	Nissan Stadium (69,143)	Nashville, Tennessee	$5,700,000	Liberty Mutual	Music City Bowl, American General Music City Bowl, homepoint.com Music City Bowl, Gaylord Hotels Music City Bowl, Gaylord Hotels Music City Bowl presented by Bridgestone, Franklin American Mortgage Music City Bowl, TransPerfect Music City Bowl
68 Ventures Bowl	1999	Hancock Whitney Stadium (25,450)	Mobile, Alabama	$1,500,000	68 Ventures	Mobile Alabama Bowl, GMAC Mobile Alabama Bowl, GMAC Bowl, GoDaddy.com Bowl, GoDaddy Bowl, Dollar General Bowl, LendingTree Bowl
New Orleans Bowl	2001	Caesars Superdome (73,208)	New Orleans, Louisiana	$825,000	None	New Orleans Bowl, Wyndham New Orleans Bowl, R+L Carriers New Orleans Bowl
Hawaiʻi Bowl	2002	Clarence T. C. Ching Athletics Complex (15,194)	Honolulu, Hawaii	$1,200,000	Sheraton	ConAgra Foods Hawai'i Bowl, Sheraton Hawai'i Bowl, SoFi Hawai'i Bowl, EasyPost Hawai'i Bowl
Duke's Mayo Bowl	2002	Bank of America Stadium (73,778)	Charlotte, North Carolina	$4,780,461	Duke's Mayonnaise	Queen City Bowl, Continental Tire Bowl, Meineke Car Care Bowl, Belk Bowl
Armed Forces Bowl	2003	Amon G. Carter Stadium (45,000)	Fort Worth, Texas	$1,350,000	Lockheed Martin	PlainsCapital Fort Worth Bowl, Fort Worth Bowl, Bell Helicopter Armed Forces Bowl
Texas Bowl	2006	NRG Stadium (71,054)	Houston, Texas	$6,400,000	Kinder's	Texas Bowl, Meineke Car Care Bowl of Texas, AdvoCare V100 Texas Bowl, Academy Sports + Outdoors Texas Bowl, Mercari Texas Bowl, TaxAct Texas Bowl
Birmingham Bowl	2006	Protective Stadium (47,100)	Birmingham, Alabama	$1,374,545	JLab Audio	Birmingham Bowl, Papajohns.com Bowl, BBVA Compass Bowl, Jared Birmingham Bowl, TicketSmarter Birmingham Bowl, 76 Birmingham Bowl
New Mexico Bowl	2006	University Stadium (39,224)	Albuquerque, New Mexico	$1,050,000	Isleta	New Mexico Bowl, Gildan New Mexico Bowl, PUBG New Mexico Bowl
Poinsettia Bowl	2006	Snapdragon Stadium (35,000)	San Diego, California	TBD	San Diego County Credit Union	None
Military Bowl	2008	Navy–Marine Corps Memorial Stadium (34,000)	Annapolis, Maryland	$2,066,990	Freedom Mortgage	Congressional Bowl, EagleBank Bowl, Military Bowl presented by Northrop Grumman, Military Bowl presented by Perspecta, Military Bowl presented by Peraton, Military Bowl presented by GoBowling.com, GoBowling Military Bowl
Gasparilla Bowl	2008	Raymond James Stadium (65,890)	Tampa, Florida	$1,125,000	Union Home Mortgage	St. Petersburg Bowl, magicJack St. Petersburg Bowl, Beef 'O' Brady's St. Petersburg Bowl, Beef 'O' Brady's Bowl, Bitcoin St. Petersburg Bowl, St. Petersburg Bowl, Bad Boy Mowers Gasparilla Bowl
Pinstripe Bowl	2010	Yankee Stadium (54,251)	Bronx, New York	$4,400,000	Bad Boy Mowers	New Era Pinstripe Bowl
First Responder Bowl	2010	Gerald J. Ford Stadium (32,000)	Dallas, Texas	$824,545	Servpro	Dallas Football Classic, TicketCity Bowl, Heart of Dallas Bowl presented by PlainsCapital Bank, Zaxby's Heart of Dallas Bowl
Boca Raton Bowl	2014	Flagler Credit Union Stadium (29,419)	Boca Raton, Florida	$900,000	None	Boca Raton Bowl, Marmot Boca Raton Bowl, Cheribundi Boca Raton Bowl, RoofClaim.com Boca Raton Bowl, Bush's Boca Raton Bowl of Beans (Note: Bush's is a brand of baked beans produced by Bush Brothers and Company.)
Salute to Veterans Bowl	2014	Cramton Bowl (25,000)	Montgomery, Alabama	$300,000	Integrated Solutions for Systems, Inc. (IS4S)	Raycom Media Camellia Bowl, Camillia Bowl, TaxAct Camellia Bowl
Cure Bowl	2015	Camping World Stadium (60,219)	Orlando, Florida	$573,125	StaffDNA	AutoNation Cure Bowl, FBC Mortgage Cure Bowl, Tailgreeter Cure Bowl, Duluth Trading Company Cure Bowl, Avocados from Mexico Cure Bowl
Arizona Bowl	2015	Casino Del Sol Stadium (56,029)	Tucson, Arizona	$350,000	Gin & Juice by Dre and Snoop	NOVA Home Loans Arizona Bowl, Offerpad Arizona Bowl, Barstool Sports Arizona Bowl
Frisco Bowl	2017	Toyota Stadium (Note: The 2025 edition of the Frisco Bowl was relocated to the Ford Center at The Star due to renovation work.) (11,000)	Frisco, Texas	$650,000	None	de facto replacement for the Miami Beach Bowl, which was sold to ESPN Events and relocated to Frisco, Texas. DXL Frisco Bowl, Tropical Smoothie Cafe Frisco Bowl, Scooter's Coffee Frisco Bowl
Myrtle Beach Bowl	2020	Brooks Stadium (20,000)	Conway, South Carolina	TBD	None	Myrtle Beach Bowl presented by Engine
Fenway Bowl	2022 (Note: The Fenway Bowl was first planned to be played in 2020; however, both the 2020 and 2021 editions were canceled due to COVID-19 issues.)	Fenway Park (37,755)	Boston, Massachusetts	TBD	Wasabi	None
Frisco Football Classic	2025	Ford Center at The Star (12,000)	Frisco, Texas	TBD	None	de facto replacement for the Bahamas Bowl Xbox Bowl
Puerto Rico Bowl	2026	Juan Ramón Loubriel Stadium (24,000)	Bayamón, Puerto Rico	TBD	Sanders Grossman Law	None
San Juan Bowl	2026	Hiram Bithorn Stadium (19,125)	San Juan, Puerto Rico	TBD	TransPerfect	None

== Non-FBS bowl games ==
=== Division I FCS bowls ===
Name	First game	Venue (permanent seating)	City	Most recent per team payout (+ revenue pool)	Title sponsor	Conference tie-ins	Previous name(s)
Celebration Bowl (HBCU National Championship)	2015	Mercedes-Benz Stadium (71,000)	Atlanta, Georgia	$1,000,000	Cricket Wireless	MEAC; SWAC	Pelican Bowl (1972–1975); Heritage Bowl (1991–1999); Legacy Bowl (proposed 2010); Air Force Reserve Celebration Bowl

=== Division II bowls ===
NOTE: These games are the Division II equivalent of the FBS bowls that are not integrated into the College Football Playoff. They provide a postseason venue for teams that do not qualify for the NCAA Division II Football Championship playoffs.

Name	First game	Venue (permanent seating)	City	Title sponsor	Conference tie-ins	Previous name(s)
Heritage Bowl	2017	Tiger Stadium (10,001)	Corsicana, Texas	Riot Platforms	GAC; LSC; MIAA	Corsicana Bowl (2017–2018)
Albanese Candy Bowl	2019	Brickyard Stadium (5,000)	Hobart, Indiana	Albanese Candy	GLVC; G-MAC	America's Crossroads Bowl (2019–2024)
First Americans Bowl	2025	Doc Wadley Stadium (8,300)	Tahlequah, Oklahoma	7 Clans Talent Agency	Schools with "strong Native American connections"	None

=== Division III bowls ===
NOTE: These games are the Division III equivalent of the FBS bowls that are not integrated into the College Football Playoff. They provide a postseason venue for teams that do not qualify for the NCAA Division III Football Championship playoffs.

Name	First game	Venue (permanent seating)	City	Title sponsor	Conference tie-ins	Previous name(s)
ECAC Bowl Series: Asa S. Bushnell Bowl; Clayton Chapman Bowl; Scotty Whitelaw Bowl; James Lynah Bowl (Not always held)	2015	Varies (campus sites)		—N/a	ECAC	ECAC Bowl (1983–2003); Regional ECAC bowl games (1983–2014)
Centennial-MAC Bowl Series: 3 unnamed bowls	2015	Varies (campus sites)		—N/a	Centennial & MAC	None
Isthmus Bowl	2021	Bank of Sun Prairie Stadium (4,802)	Sun Prairie, Wisconsin	Culver's	WIAC & CCIW	None
Lakefront Bowl	2022	Schneider Stadium	Waukesha, Wisconsin	Smiley Cookie	MWC & NACC	None
Chesapeake Bowl Challenge: Cape Charles Bowl; Cape Henry Bowl	2023	Varies (campus sites)		—N/a	Landmark & ODAC	None
Fusion Bowl	2024	Varies (campus sites)		—N/a	NEWMAC & CNE	None
Opendorse Bowl Series: Extra Points Bowl; ForeverLawn Bowl	2024	Tom Benson Hall of Fame Stadium (23,000)	Canton, Ohio	Opendorse; ExtraPointsMB.com; ForeverLawn	OAC, PAC, HCAC, & NCAC	None
Riverbend Bowl Series: 2 unnamed bowls	2026	Rocket Stadium (4,000)	Neenah, Wisconsin	—N/a	ARC, MIAA, MWC, & NACC	None

Additionally, the Amos Alonzo Stagg Bowl has served as the championship game for Division III since 1973. It has been played at Phenix City, Alabama (1973–1982, 1985–1989), Kings Island, Ohio (1983–1984), Bradenton, Florida (1990–1992), Salem, Virginia (1993–2017, 2023). Canton, Ohio (2021, 2025), Annapolis, Maryland (2022), and Humble, Texas (2024).

=== NAIA bowl games ===
The NAIA's national championship game (which is the conclusion of a 16 team playoff) is currently not named as a bowl, but has held a bowl name in the past. Additionally, from 1970 to 1996, NAIA football was split into two divisions and held a separate tournaments and championships for both divisions; the Division II championship was never named a bowl and as such the past names listed below do not apply to the Division II championship game.

Name	First game	Venue (permanent seating)	City	Title sponsor	Previous name(s)
NAIA national football championship	1956	Municipal Stadium (9,601)	Daytona Beach, Florida	NAIA; Waste Pro	Aluminum Bowl (1956); Holiday Bowl (1957–1960); Camellia Bowl (1961–1963); Championship Bowl (1964–1976, 1980–1996); Apple Bowl (1977); Palm Bowl (1978–1979)

== Proposed games ==
The number of bowl games have risen steadily, reaching 41 (including the national championship game) by the 2015 bowl season. To fill the 80 available bowl slots, a record 15 teams with non-winning seasons participated in bowl games—including three with a record of 5–7. This situation led directly to the NCAA Division I Council imposing a three-year moratorium on new bowl games in April 2016.

Since 2010, organizers and boosters have continued to propose other bowl games—some of these proposals have since been dropped, while others are active proposals that have been placed on hold during the NCAA moratorium.

Name	Year to start	Venue (permanent seating)	City	Payout	Sponsor(s)	Previous name(s)
Chili Bowl	TBD	TQL Stadium (26,000)	Cincinnati, Ohio	TBD	TBD	None previous
Chicago Bowl	TBD	Wrigley Field (41,268)	Chicago, Illinois	TBD	TBD	None previous
Chocolate Bowl	TBD	Hersheypark Stadium (15,641)	Hershey, Pennsylvania	TBD	TBD	None previous
Austin Bowl	TBD	Darrell K Royal–Texas Memorial Stadium (100,119)	Austin, Texas	TBD	TBD	None previous
Medal of Honor Bowl	TBD	Johnson Hagood Stadium (21,000)	Charleston, South Carolina	TBD	TBD	None previous
Little Rock Bowl	TBD	War Memorial Stadium (54,120)	Little Rock, Arkansas	TBD	TBD	None previous
Melbourne Bowl	TBD	Marvel Stadium (56,347); AAMI Park (29,500)	Melbourne, Victoria, Australia	TBD	TBD	None previous
Dubai bowl game	TBD	TBD	Dubai, United Arab Emirates	TBD	TBD	None previous
Ireland bowl game	TBD	TBD	Ireland (specific city TBD)	TBD	TBD	None previous
Toronto bowl game	TBD	Rogers Centre (54,000); BMO Field (28,180)	Toronto, Ontario, Canada	TBD	TBD	International Bowl
St. Louis bowl game	TBD	The Dome at America's Center (67,277); Busch Stadium(44,383)	St. Louis, Missouri	TBD	TBD	None previous

Two proposed games, the Cure Bowl and Christmas Bowl, were turned down by the NCAA for 2010. The Cure Bowl was eventually added in 2014, for the 2015 bowl season.

In August 2013, the Detroit Lions announced that it would hold a new bowl game at Ford Field beginning in 2014, holding Big Ten and Atlantic Coast Conference tie-ins, despite the existence of the Little Caesars Pizza Bowl. While Pizza Bowl organizers attempted to move the game to Comerica Park (a baseball stadium across the street from Ford Field), these plans never came to fruition. In August 2014, the Lions announced that the new game would be known as the Quick Lane Bowl, and play its inaugural game on December 26, 2014. In a statement to Crain's Detroit Business, Motor City Bowl co-founder Ken Hoffman confirmed that there would be no Little Caesars Pizza Bowl for 2014.

In June 2013, ESPN.com reported that the so-called "Group of Five" conferences—the American Athletic Conference, Conference USA, MAC, Mountain West Conference, and Sun Belt Conference—were considering adding one or more new bowl games once the NCAA's current moratorium on new bowls expires after the 2013 season. This move was driven by a trend for the then-"Power Five" conferences (ACC, Big Ten, Big 12, Pac-12, and SEC) to play one another in bowl games. The 2013 season, the last of the then-current four-year bowl cycle, had 16 bowls that involved two teams from "Power Five" leagues. The 2014 season, the first of a new six-year bowl cycle, would have at least 19, and possibly more, matchups of "Power Five" teams. The "Group of Five" was apparently concerned that this trend would mean that its teams might not have available bowl slots.

According to reports, the 2010 Christmas Bowl proposal would have involved a Mountain West team against an opponent from either the Pac-12 or The American. As for The American, it has suggested a new bowl game, most likely at Marlins Park in Miami. Two other venues of then-"Group of Five" schools in Florida—Spectrum Stadium (UCF, Orlando) and FAU Stadium (Florida Atlantic, Boca Raton)—were being considered for other potential bowls. A possible bowl in Little Rock would pit C-USA and the Sun Belt. Finally, the director of the current Little Caesars Bowl indicated that he had been in contact with officials from all of the "Group of Five" about starting new bowl games in Ireland (most likely Dublin), Dubai, and either Toronto or Nassau. Recently, though, reports have indicated the proposed games in Ireland and Dubai would be unworkable.

The first new bowl to be confirmed for 2014 was the Camellia Bowl, a game created by ESPN and played in Montgomery, Alabama. It secured tie-ins with the MAC and Sun Belt, and an initial contract to run through the 2019 season. ESPN was also reported to be in negotiations to take over ownership of the existing Heart of Dallas Bowl and establish a new bowl game in Boca Raton.

Another ownership group interested in starting a Montgomery-based bowl at New ASU Stadium reportedly switched focus to Charleston, South Carolina. In the face of obstacles related to an NCAA ban on playing postseason games at predetermined locations in South Carolina due to the Confederate battle flag being flown at a civil war monument on the State House grounds, the ownership group instead chose to stage the Medal of Honor Bowl all-star game at Johnson Hagood Stadium beginning in 2014. However, with the Confederate flag's removal from the State House grounds on July 10, 2015, the NCAA lifted its ban that day. As such, on August 27 of that year, the Medal of Honor Bowl announced their plans to become a traditional postseason bowl game beginning on December 18, 2016, pending NCAA approval. The all-star game format was not played that year as a result. However, in April 2016, the NCAA announced a moratorium on new bowl games; organizers had subsequently announced plans to hold the bowl (as an all-star game again) in January 2018; however, no further editions of the Medal of Honor Bowl have been played.

== Maps of bowl games ==
=== NCAA Division I bowl games ===
List of numbered map items:
1 Rose Bowl (CFP bowl game)
2 Orange Bowl (CFP bowl game)
3 Sugar Bowl (CFP bowl game)
4 Cotton Bowl (CFP bowl game)
5 Peach Bowl (CFP bowl game)
6 Fiesta Bowl (CFP bowl game)
7 Sun Bowl
8 Gator Bowl
9 Citrus Bowl
10 Liberty Bowl
11 Independence Bowl
12 Holiday Bowl
13 ReliaQuest Bowl
14 Cactus Bowl
15 Pop-Tarts Bowl
16 Las Vegas Bowl
17 Alamo Bowl
18 Famous Idaho Potato Bowl
19 Music City Bowl
20 68 Ventures Bowl
21 New Orleans Bowl
22 Duke's Mayo Bowl
23 Armed Forces Bowl
24 Texas Bowl
25 Birmingham Bowl
26 New Mexico Bowl
27 Military Bowl
28 Gasparilla Bowl
29 Pinstripe Bowl
30 First Responder Bowl
31 Xbox Bowl
32 Boca Raton Bowl
33 Salute to Veterans Bowl
34 Cure Bowl
35 Arizona Bowl
36 Frisco Bowl
37 Myrtle Beach Bowl
38 Fenway Bowl
39 Celebration Bowl

=== Fixed-location non-NCAA Division I bowl games ===
List of numbered map items:
1 Heritage Bowl
2 Albanese Candy Bowl
3 First Americans Bowl
4 Isthmus Bowl
5 Lakefront Bowl
6 Riverbend Bowl Series
7 Opendorse Bowl Series

== Number of current FBS bowl games by state ==
State	Number	Bowls
Florida	8	Orange*, Boca Raton, Citrus, Cure, Gasparilla, Gator, ReliaQuest, Pop-Tarts
Texas	8	Cotton*, Alamo, Armed Forces, First Responder, Frisco, Sun, Texas, Xbox
Alabama	3	Birmingham, Salute to Veterans, 68 Ventures
Arizona	3	Fiesta*, Arizona, Cactus
California	3	Rose*, Holiday, Poinsettia
Louisiana	3	Sugar*, Independence, New Orleans
Tennessee	2	Liberty, Music City
Georgia	1	Peach*
Hawaii	1	Hawaii
Idaho	1	Famous Idaho Potato
Maryland	1	Military
Massachusetts	1	Fenway
Nevada	1	Las Vegas
New Mexico	1	New Mexico
New York	1	Pinstripe
North Carolina	1	Duke's Mayo
South Carolina	1	Myrtle Beach

* Bowl is a College Football Playoff semifinal, once every three seasons, in rotation under current CFP format

== All-star games ==
=== FBS all-star games ===
All-star games predominantly featuring players from the FBS-level (or historical equivalents, such as Division I-A).

Name	Status	Years	City	Notes
East–West Shrine Bowl	Active	1925–present	Various locations, most recently Frisco, Texas (2024, 2026) and Arlington, Texas (2025)	Has invited Canadian players since 1985
NFLPA Collegiate Bowl	Defunct	2012–2023	Pasadena, California	
Senior Bowl	Active	1950–present	Jacksonville, Florida (1950); Mobile, Alabama (1951–present)	Two separate venues in Mobile: Ladd–Peebles Stadium (1951–2020) and Hancock Whitney Stadium (2021–present)
Hula Bowl	Active	1960–2008, 2020–present	Staged in Hawaii 1960–2005; Orlando, Florida (2022–2025); DeLand, Florida (2026)	First help with non-collegiate players (1947)
Medal of Honor Bowl	Defunct	2014–2015	Charleston, South Carolina	
Blue–Gray Football Classic	Defunct	1939–2001; 2003	Montgomery, Alabama; Troy, Alabama	
Casino del Sol College All-Star Game	Defunct	2011–2013	Tempe, Arizona (2011); Tucson, Arizona (2012–13)	Eastham Energy College All-Star Game in 2011
Challenge Bowl	Defunct	1978–1979	Seattle, Washington	Pac-8 all-stars vs. Big Ten all-stars (1978); Pac-10 all-stars vs. Big Eight all-stars (1979)
Chicago College All-Star Game	Defunct	1934–1976	Chicago, Illinois (1934–42, 1945–76); Evanston, Illinois (1943–44)	College all-stars vs. NFL champions
College All-Star Bowl	Defunct	2013–2014	Greenville, South Carolina	
Gridiron Classic	Defunct	1999–2005	Orlando, Florida (1999–2003); The Villages, Florida (2004–05)	
Japan Bowl	Defunct	1976–1993	Tokyo, Japan (1976–79, 1992–93); Yokohama, Japan (1980–91)	
Las Vegas All-American Classic	Defunct	2002–2006	St. George, Utah (2002–03); Las Vegas, Nevada (2004–06)	Played as the Paradise Bowl in Utah
Magnolia Gridiron All-Star Classic	Defunct	2005–2006	Jackson, Mississippi	Division I-A vs. Division I-AA/II/III
North–South All-Star Classic	Defunct	2007	Houston, Texas	Also known as the Inta-Juice All-Star Classic
North–South Shrine Game	Defunct	1948–1973; 1976	Miami, Florida; Pontiac, Michigan	Started with high school teams in 1946
Players All-Star Classic	Defunct	2012	Little Rock, Arkansas	
Raycom All-Star Classic	Defunct	2013	Montgomery, Alabama	
Texas vs The Nation	Defunct	2007–2011; 2013	El Paso, Texas (2007–10); San Antonio, Texas (2011); Allen, Texas (2013)	
The American Bowl	Active	2026–present	Lakeland, Florida	

=== Other all-star games ===
Name	Status	Years	City	Notes
National Bowl Game	Active	2011–present	Allentown, Pennsylvania (2011–2012); Miami, Florida (2013–2015); Daytona Beach, Florida (2016–present)	Division II/III and NAIA
FCS Bowl	Active	2014–present	Miami, Florida (2014–2015); Daytona Beach, Florida (2016–present)	FCS
Dream Bowl	Active	2016–present	Roanoke, Virginia (2016–2019); Salem, Virginia (2020–2023); Little Elm, Texas (2024–present)	Division II/III and FCS
HBCU Legacy Bowl	Active	2022–present	New Orleans, Louisiana	Players from historically black colleges and universities, such as schools in the MEAC and SWAC, both of which are FCS
Cactus Bowl	Defunct	1994–2011	Fargo, North Dakota (1994–2000); Kingsville, Texas (2001–2011)	Played as the Snow Bowl in Fargo; Division II
USA College Football Bowl	Defunct	1996–2015	multiple locations (1996–2014); Jackson, Mississippi (2015)	Initially Division III, later all levels 2016 game was cancelled
East Coast Bowl	Defunct	2001–2009	Petersburg, Virginia	Division II/III and NAIA
Epson Ivy Bowl	Defunct	1988–1996	Yokohama, Japan; Tokyo, Japan; Nishinomiya, Japan	Three years in Yokohama; Three years in Tokyo; Two years in Nishinomiya

== Regular season games called bowls ==
- Black and Blue Bowl – Memphis and Southern Miss
- Empire State Bowl – Columbia and Cornell
- Confusion Bowl – Miami (OH) and Miami (FL)
- Crab Bowl Classic – Maryland and Navy
- Egg Bowl – Ole Miss and Mississippi State
- Georgia Grown Bowl (Note: More often called "Modern Day Hate".) – Georgia Southern and Georgia State
- Iron Bowl – Alabama and Auburn
- Magnolia Bowl – LSU and Ole Miss
- Oyster Bowl - currently Old Dominion and rotating teams
- Palmetto Bowl – Clemson and South Carolina
- Safeway Bowl – North Texas and SMU
- Shula Bowl – FIU and Florida Atlantic
- Soul Bowl – Alcorn State and Jackson State
- Textile Bowl – Clemson and North Carolina State

== Bowl games played outside of the US ==
- Aztec Bowl – Mexico (1950–53, 1955, 1957, 1964–66, 1970–71, 1971–80, 1984, 1986–present)
- Bacardi Bowl – seven exhibition games played in Havana, Cuba, from 1907 to 1946
- International Bowl – bowl game played in Toronto, Canada, from 2007 to 2010
- Bahamas Bowl – bowl game played in Nassau, Bahamas, from 2014 to 2024.

== Junior college bowl games ==
- C.H.A.M.P.S. Heart of Texas Bowl – Copperas Cove, Texas
- Game One Bowl – Cedar Falls, Iowa (formerly Coca-Cola Bowl, Like Cola Bowl, Royal Crown Bowl, Pepsi-Cola/Sigler Printing Bowl, The Graphic Edge Bowl). This bowl is a doubleheader with the Iowa runner-up playing in the first game and the Iowa champion in the second. The opponents for each game are chosen at-large.
- Mississippi Bowl – Biloxi, Mississippi
- Midwest Classic Bowl – Miami, Oklahoma
- Red Grange Bowl – Glen Ellyn, Illinois
- Salt City Bowl – Hutchinson, Kansas

=== Defunct ===
- Beef Empire Classic – Garden City, Kansas
- Brazos Valley Bowl – Bryan, Texas
- Carrier Dome Bowl – Syracuse, New York
- Citizens Bank Bowl – Pittsburg, Kansas. Known in its last season as the Football Capital of Kansas Bowl. Hosted 2009 National Junior College Athletic Association National Championship game between Blinn and Fort Scott, which featured future NFL stars Cam Newton and Lavonte David.
- Dalton Defenders Bowl – Coffeyville, Kansas
- Dixie Rotary Bowl – St. George, Utah
- East Bowl – rotating site among Coastal Conference schools
- El Toro Bowl – Yuma, Arizona
- Empire State Bowl – Uniondale, New York
- Garland Texas Bowl – Garland, Texas
- Gold Bowl – Richmond, Virginia
- Golden Isles Bowl – Brunswick, Georgia
- Grenn Country Bowl – Tahlequah, Oklahoma
- Junior Rose Bowl – Pasadena, California
- Kansas Jayhawk Bowl Classic – Coffeyville, Kansas
- Mid-America Bowl – Tulsa, Oklahoma
- Midwest Bowl – rotating site among North Central Community College Conference schools
- Mineral Water Bowl – Excelsior Springs, Missouri
- Mississippi Magnolia Bowl – MACJC Championship game, rotating site
- North Star Bowl – Rochester, Minnesota
- Palm Bowl – McAllen, Texas
- Pilgrim's Pride Bowl – Mt. Pleasant, Texas
- Real Dairy Bowl – Pocatello, Idaho
- Red River Bowl – Bedford, Texas
- Refrigerator Bowl – Evansville, Indiana
- Roaring Ranger Bowl – Ranger, Texas
- Robert A. Bothman Bulldog Bowl – San Mateo, California
- Rodeo Bowl – Arkansas City, Kansas
- Sterling Silver Bowl – Sterling, Kansas
- Texas Shrine Bowl – Tyler, Texas
- Top of the Mountain Bowl – Sandy, Utah
- Valley of the Sun Bowl – rotating site in Maricopa County, Arizona
- Wool Bowl – Roswell, New Mexico
- Zia Bowl – Albuquerque, New Mexico

Source: NJCAA

== Defunct bowl games ==
=== Defunct major-college bowl games ===
Bowl name	Years played	Location	Notes
Alamo Bowl	1947	San Antonio, Texas	Not to be confused with the modern Alamo Bowl
All-American Bowl	1977–1990	Birmingham, Alabama	Known as the Hall of Fame Classic through 1985.
Aloha Bowl	1982–2000	Honolulu, Hawaii	
Aviation Bowl	1961	Dayton, Ohio	
Bacardi Bowl	1907, 1909, 1911–1912, 1921, 1936, 1946	Havana, Cuba	Last game in 1946, Southern Mississippi defeated Havana University, 55-0
Bahamas Bowl	2014-2024	Nassau, Bahamas	
Bluebonnet Bowl	1959–1987	Houston, Texas	Known as the Astro-Bluebonnet Bowl whenever the game was played in the Astrodome.
Bluegrass Bowl	1958	Louisville, Kentucky	
California Bowl	1981–1991	Fresno, California	Superseded by the Las Vegas Bowl.
Cherry Bowl	1984–1985	Pontiac, Michigan	
Delta Bowl	1947–1948	Memphis, Tennessee	
Dixie Bowl	1947–1948	Birmingham, Alabama	
Dixie Classic	1921, 1924, 1933	Dallas, Texas	Forerunner to the current Cotton Bowl Classic
Famous Toastery Bowl	2023	Charlotte, North Carolina	One year substitution for the Bahamas Bowl.
Fort Worth Classic	1920	Fort Worth, Texas	
Freedom Bowl	1984–1994	Anaheim, California	
Frisco Football Classic	2021	Frisco, Texas	Created to accommodate all bowl-eligible teams for the 2021 College football season
GameAbove Sports Bowl	2014–2025	Detroit, Michigan	de facto replacement for the Little Caesars Pizza Bowl which ran from 1997 to 2013. Known as the Quick Lane Bowl from 2014 to 2023.
Garden State Bowl	1978–1981	East Rutherford, New Jersey	
Gotham Bowl	1961–1962	New York City, New York	
Great Lakes Bowl	1947	Cleveland, Ohio	
Harbor Bowl	1946–1948	San Diego, California	
Houston Bowl	2000–2005	Houston, Texas	Called the galleryfurniture.com Bowl in 2000–2001
International Bowl	2006–2009	Toronto, Ontario	
LA Bowl	2021–2025	Inglewood, California	
Little Caesars Pizza Bowl	1997–2013	Detroit, Michigan (1997–2001: Pontiac, Michigan)	Also known as the Ford Motor City Bowl and the Motor City Bowl. Was replaced by the Quick Lane Bowl in 2014.
Los Angeles Christmas Festival	1924	Los Angeles, California	
Mercy Bowl	1961, 1971	Los Angeles, California	
Miami Beach Bowl	2014–2016	Miami, Florida	Sold and moved to Frisco, Texas
Montgomery Bowl	2020	Montgomery, Alabama	One-season substitute for the Fenway Bowl.
Oahu Bowl	1998–2000	Honolulu, Hawaii	
Oil Bowl	1943, 1945–1946	Houston, Texas	
Pasadena Bowl	1967–1971	Pasadena, California	
Presidential Cup Bowl	1950	College Park, Maryland	
Raisin Bowl	1945–1949	Fresno, California	
Salad Bowl	1947–1951	Phoenix, Arizona	Precursor to current Fiesta Bowl
San Diego East-West Christmas Classic	1921–1922	San Diego, California	
San Francisco Bowl	2002–2019	San Francisco Bay Area, California	
Seattle Bowl	2001–2002	Seattle, Washington	Continuation of the Oahu Bowl.
Shrine Bowl	1948–1949	Little Rock, Arkansas	
Silicon Valley Football Classic	2000–2004	San Jose, California	

=== Defunct Division I-AA bowl games ===
- Camellia Bowl – Sacramento, California (1980)
- Heritage Bowl – Atlanta, Georgia (1991–1999)
- Pioneer Bowl – Wichita Falls, Texas (1978, 1981–1982)
- Gridiron Classic – rotating locations (2006–2009)
- ECAC Bowl – rotating locations (1993–2003)

=== Defunct Division II bowl games ===
- Bicentennial Bowl – Richmond, Virginia (1976)
- Boardwalk Bowl – Atlantic City, New Jersey (1973)
- Camellia Bowl – Sacramento, California (1973–1975)
- Dixie Rotary Bowl – Saint George, Utah (2006–2008)
- Florida Beach Bowl – Fort Lauderdale, Florida (2023)
- Gold Bowl – Richmond, Virginia (1977–1980)
- Grantland Rice Bowl – Murfreesboro, Tennessee & Baton Rouge, Louisiana (1973–1977)
- Heart of Texas Bowl – Copperas Cove, Texas & Waco, Texas (2012–2018)
- Kanza Bowl – Topeka, Kansas (2009–2012)
- Knute Rockne Bowl – Akron, Ohio & Davis, California (1976–1977)
- Live United Texarkana Bowl – Texarkana, Arkansas (2013–2023)
- Mineral Water Bowl – Excelsior Springs, Missouri (2000–2019)
- Pioneer Bowl – Wichita Falls, Texas (1973–1977)
- Pioneer Bowl – various locations as a bowl between HBCU teams (1997–2012)

=== Defunct Division III bowl games ===
- Oyster Bowl – Norfolk, Virginia (at various times in its history a Division I bowl game, a Division III bowl game and, currently, a regular season game)
- ECAC Presidents Bowl - New Britain, Connecticut (2015) and Philadelphia, Pennsylvania (2016)
- ECAC Legacy Bowl - New Britain, Connecticut (2015) and Philadelphia, Pennsylvania (2016)
- New York State Bowl - Campus Sites (2017-2019)

=== Defunct NAIA bowl games ===
- All-Sports Bowl - Oklahoma City, Oklahoma (1961–1964)
- Bicentennial Bowl - Little Rock, Arkansas (1975)
- Boot Hill Bowl - Dodge City, Kansas (1970–1980)
- Cowboy Bowl - Lawton, Oklahoma (1971–1972)
- Great Southwest Bowl - Grand Prairie, Texas (1960)
- Poultry Bowl – Gainesville, Georgia (1973), Greensboro, North Carolina (1974)
- Share Bowl - Knoxville, Tennessee (1971)
- Shrine Bowl - Ardmore, Oklahoma (1972)
- Sunflower Bowl - Winfield, Kansas (1982–1986)
- Wheat Bowl - Ellinwood, Kansas, Great Bend, Kansas (1995–2006), Pre-season NAIA bowl

=== Other defunct college bowl games ===
- Victory Bowl (NCCAA, 1997–2022)

=== Defunct regular-season games known as bowl games ===
Name	Seasons Active	City	Notes
Harvest Bowl	1958–1969	Roanoke, Virginia	
Mirage Bowl	1976–1993	Tokyo, Japan	A regular season matchup, originally at Korakuen Stadium, later at Olympic Stadium, and finally at the Tokyo Dome
Oyster Bowl	1948–1995	Norfolk, Virginia	A regular season game called a "bowl", now a home game for Old Dominion University to raise money for the Kedive Shriner's charities
Patriot Bowl	2007–2009	Cleveland, Ohio	A regular season game called a "bowl" that featured a team from the Mid-American Conference and (originally) one of the United States service academies
Tobacco Bowl	1949–1982	Richmond, Virginia	

=== Defunct minor-college or unofficial bowl games ===
Name	Seasons active	City	Notes
Angel Bowl	1946	Los Angeles, California	Florida A&M vs. Wiley
Azalea Bowl	1945	Orlando, Florida	Florida Memorial University vs. Knoxville College
Azalea Classic	1971, 1974	Mobile, Alabama	Featuring HBCUs
Bean Bowl	1949–1950	Scottsbluff, Nebraska	
Beaver Bowl	1958	Corry, Pennsylvania	Slippery Rock University vs. Pennsylvania Western University
Boardwalk Bowl	1961–1972	Atlantic City, New Jersey	A College Division regional final 1968–1972, later a Division II quarterfinal.
Botany Bowl	1955	Shenandoah, Iowa	Nebraska-Kearney vs. Northern State
Boy's Ranch Bowl	1947	Abilene, Texas	Missouri Valley College vs. McMurry University
Burley Bowl	1945–1956	Johnson City, Tennessee	Played on Thanksgiving Day each year
Cajun Bowl	1947	Lake Charles, Louisiana	
Cattle Bowl	1947–1948	Fort Worth, Texas	
Camellia Bowl	1964–1972	Sacramento, California	A College Division regional final 1964–1972, later a playoff game in I-AA and D-II. Not to be confused with the current Camellia Bowl in FBS.
Cement Bowl	1962	Allentown, Pennsylvania	Hofstra Pride vs. West Chester Golden Rams
Charity Bowl	1937	Los Angeles, California	Fresno State vs. Central Arkansas
Chocolate Bowl	1935	Tyler, Texas	Texas College Steers vs. Alabama State Hornets
Christmas Bowl	1958–1959	Natchitoches, Louisiana	
Cigar Bowl	1946–1954	Tampa, Florida	
Coconut Bowl	1946	Miami, Florida	Bethune-Cookman vs. Albany State
Corn Bowl	1947–1955	Bloomington, Illinois	
Cosmopolitan Bowl	1951	Alexandria, Louisiana	McNeese State vs. Louisiana College
Cotton-Tobacco Bowl	1946–1947	Greensboro, North Carolina	
Eastern Bowl	1963	Allentown, Pennsylvania	Northeastern Huskies vs. East Carolina Pirates
Elks Bowl	1953–1954	Greenville, North Carolina; Raleigh, North Carolina	Both games were played in calendar year 1954.
Festival of Palms Bowl	1932–1933	Miami, Florida	Hosted by University of Miami, it become the Orange Bowl for the 1934 season
Fish Bowl (Texas)	1948	Corpus Christi, Texas	University of Corpus Christi vs. Southwestern University
Fish Bowl (Virginia)	1948	Norfolk, Virginia	Hampton Pirates vs. Central State Marauders
Flower Bowl	1942–1948	Jacksonville, Florida	Featuring HBCUs
Fruit Bowl	1947–1948	San Francisco, California	1948 game was the first inter-racial college bowl game
Furniture Bowl	1950	Martinsville, Virginia	Maryland State Hawks vs. Bluefield State Big Blues
Glass Bowl	1946–1949	Toledo, Ohio	Hosted by University of Toledo
Golden Isles Bowl	1962	Brunswick, Georgia	McNeese State University vs. Samford University
Grantland Rice Bowl	1964–1972	Murfreesboro, Tennessee; Baton Rouge, Louisiana	A College Division regional final for nine years; later a Division II playoff game.
Grape Bowl	1947–1948	Lodi, California	
Great Lakes Bowl	1948	Cleveland, Ohio	John Carroll Blue Streaks vs. Canisius Golden Griffins. Played in 1947 as a major bowl game
Hoosier Bowl	1946	Evansville, Indiana	Evansville Purple Aces vs. Northern Illinois Huskies
Iodine Bowl	1949–1951, 1953	Charleston, South Carolina	Hosted by Allen University. Featuring HBCUs.
Kickapoo Bowl	1947	Wichita Falls, Texas	Midwestern State Mustangs vs. Central Arkansas Bears
Knute Rockne Bowl	1969–1972	Bridgeport, Connecticut; Atlantic City, New Jersey	A College Division regional final for four years; later a Division II playoff game.
Lions Bowl	1946–1947, 1949–1952	Ruston, Louisiana	Hosted by Grambling State University, featuring HBCUs
Mirza Shrine Bowl	1950	Pittsburg, Kansas	Pittsburg State Gorillas vs. Central Missouri Mules
Missouri-Kansas Bowl	1948	Kansas City, Missouri	Emporia State Hornets vs. Southwest Missouri State Bears
National Bowl	1947	Washington, D.C.	Shaw Bears vs. South Carolina State Bulldogs
National Classic	1954	Greensboro, North Carolina	North Carolina College vs. Tennessee A&I
New Year's Classic	1933–1934	Honolulu, Hawaii	Hosted by University of Hawaii
Oleander Bowl	1949	Galveston, Texas	McMurry University vs. Missouri Valley College
Optimist Bowl	1946	Houston, Texas	College of the Pacific was coached by Amos Alonzo Stagg.
Orange Blossom Classic	1933–1978	Miami, Florida	Hosted by Florida A&M, featuring HBCUs. The name is now used for a regular season game.
Palmetto Shrine Bowl	1955	Columbia, South Carolina	Lenoir-Rhyne Bears vs. Newberry Wolves
Paper Bowl	1948–1950	Pensacola, Florida	Hosted by Jacksonville State University
Peach Blossom Classic	1939–1942, 1947, 1949	Atlanta, Georgia; Columbus, Georgia; Macon, Georgia	Hosted by Morris Brown College, featuring HBCUs
Peanut Bowl	1968	Dothan, Alabama	West Alabama Tigers vs. Ouachita Baptist Tigers
Pear Bowl	1946–1951	Ashland, Oregon; Medford, Oregon	
Pecan Bowl	1946–1947; 1964–1967; 1968–1970	Orangeburg, South Carolina; Abilene, Texas; Arlington, Texas	HBCU matchup in 1940s, then a College Division regional final
Pelican Bowl	1972; 1974–1975	Durham, North Carolina; New Orleans, Louisiana	
Peninsula Bowl	1950	Charleston, South Carolina	Allen Yellow Jackets vs. South Carolina State Bulldogs
Phillips Field Bowl	1951	Tampa, Florida	Tampa Spartans vs. Brandeis Judges
Piedmont Tobacco Bowl	1946	Fayetteville, North Carolina	Fayetteville State Broncos vs. Allen Yellow Jackets
Pioneer Bowl	1971–1972	Wichita Falls, Texas	A College Division regional final for two years; later a playoff game in DI-AA and DII.
Pineapple Bowl	1939–1941, 1947–1952	Honolulu, Hawaii	Hosted by University of Hawaii
Poi Bowl	1936–1939	Honolulu, Hawaii	Hosted by University of Hawaii
Prairie View Bowl	1928–1960	Houston, Texas	First bowl game for HBCUs, hosted by Prairie View A&M.
Pretzel Bowl	1951	Reading, Pennsylvania	West Chester Golden Rams vs. Albright Rams
Pythian Bowl	1949–1951	Salisbury, North Carolina	First bowl game that was played in North Carolina. Known in 1952 as the Lions Bowl.
Refrigerator Bowl	1948–1956	Evansville, Indiana	
Rice Bowl	1957–1958, 1960	Stuttgart, Arkansas	
Rocket Bowl	1960	Huntsville, Alabama	Millsaps Majors vs. Maryville Scots
Shrimp Bowl	1952	Galveston, Texas	Sam Houston State Bearkats vs. Northeastern State RiverHawks
Smoky Mountain Bowl	1949	Bristol, Tennessee	Western Carolina Catamounts vs. West Liberty Hilltoppers
Space City Bowl	1966–1967	Huntsville, Alabama	
Texhoma Bowl	1948–1949	Denison, Texas	
Textile Bowl	1974	Spartanburg, South Carolina	Wofford Terriers vs. South Carolina State
Tobacco Bowl	1946	Lexington, Kentucky	Muhlenberg College vs. St. Bonaventure University
Tropical Bowl	1951–1953	Jacksonville, Florida	Featuring HBCUs
Vulcan Bowl	1941–1948, 1951	Birmingham, Alabama	Featuring HBCUs
West Virginia Bowl	1960–1961	Clarksburg, West Virginia	
Will Rogers Bowl	1947	Oklahoma City, Oklahoma	Pepperdine University vs. Nebraska Wesleyan University
Yam Bowl	1946–1947	Dallas, Texas	Featuring HBCUs

== See also ==
- Bids to college bowl games
