= Jaron Brown =

American football player (born 1990)

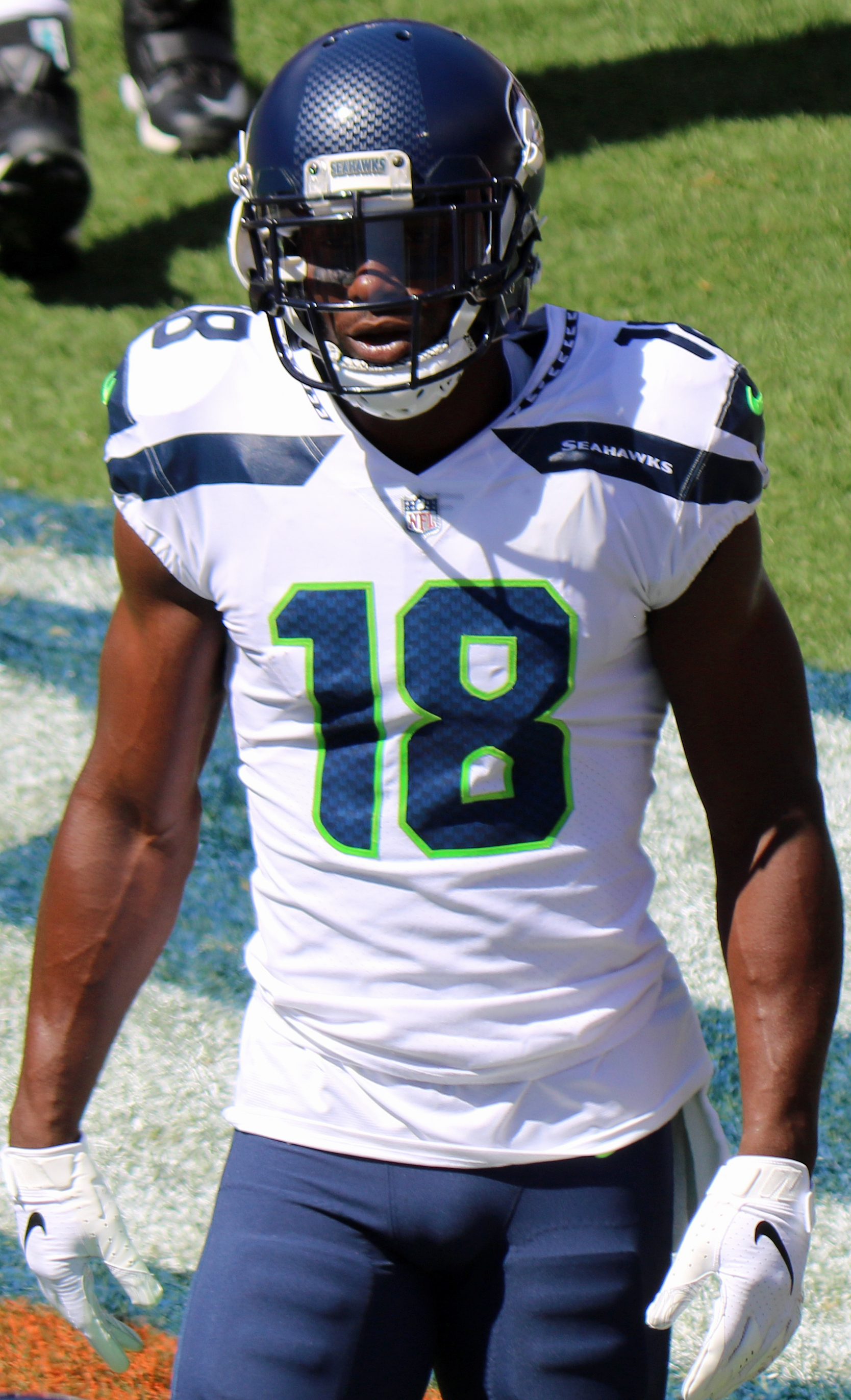
- Brown with the Seattle Seahawks in 2018

No. 13, 18
- Position: Wide receiver

Personal information
- Born: January 8, 1990 (age 36); Ceiba, Puerto Rico
- Listed height: 6 ft 3 in (1.91 m)
- Listed weight: 204 lb (93 kg)

Career information
- High school: Cheraw (Cheraw, South Carolina, U.S.)
- College: Clemson (2008–2012)
- NFL draft: 2013: undrafted

Career history
- Arizona Cardinals (2013–2017); Seattle Seahawks (2018–2019); San Francisco 49ers (2020)*; Arizona Cardinals (2020)*
- * Offseason or practice squad member only

Career NFL statistics
- Receptions: 116
- Receiving yards: 1,653
- Receiving touchdowns: 16
- Stats at Pro Football Reference

Jaron Brown (born January 8, 1990) is an American former professional football player who was a wide receiver in the National Football League (NFL). He played college football for the Clemson Tigers. He was signed by the Arizona Cardinals as an undrafted free agent in 2013.

== Early life ==
Brown attended Cheraw High School in Cheraw, South Carolina. He helped lead the Cheraw Braves to state titles both as a junior and senior. As a senior, he accumulated 31 catches for 516 yards and 16 touchdowns, being named all-state, all-area, and all-region. Playing defensive back as well, Brown had 100 tackles and four interceptions in his senior year. Brown was named the #57 athlete in the nation and #16 prospect in South Carolina by Rivals.com, as well as ranking #56 wideout in the nation by Scout.com. As a dual-athlete, Brown was a standout basketball player, being named the team's top defensive player as a senior and ran the 100m, 200m, and 4 × 100 m as an all-region track performer. Brown chose Clemson over Kentucky, Michigan, South Carolina, Tennessee, and West Virginia.

== College career ==
After redshirting his true freshman season in 2008 in which he was an ACC Academic Honor Roll member, Brown appeared in 11 games for the Clemson Tigers in 2009, had three catches for 30 yards in limited snaps.

In an increased role in 2010, Brown had 32 catches for 405 yards and three touchdowns, 63 yards on eight carries, and 52 yards on three punt returns in 535 snaps over 12 games (10 starts), while being fourth on the team in receptions and second in receiving yards. He led the team in yards per reception (12.7) and had at least one catch in all 12 games he appeared in on the season.

In 2011, Brown had 31 receptions for 406 yards and four touchdowns along with 15 kickoff returns for 308 yards in 618 snaps over 14 games (12 starts). As a team co-captain in his senior year in 2012, Brown had 21 receptions for 345 yards in 10 starts. Brown was part of a talented Clemson wide receiver core in 2012, that included DeAndre Hopkins, Sammy Watkins, Martavis Bryant, Adam Humphries, and Charone Peake.

== Professional career ==
On January 19, 2013, Brown appeared in the Raycom All-Star Classic and recorded six receptions for 63-yards to help the Stripes defeat the Stars 31–3.

Pre-draft measurables
Height	Weight	40-yard dash	10-yard split	20-yard split	20-yard shuttle	Three-cone drill	Vertical jump	Broad jump	Bench press
6 ft 2 3/8 in (1.89 m)	204 lb (93 kg)	4.40 s	1.57 s	2.53 s	4.07 s	6.82 s	35 1/2 in (0.90 m)	10 ft 4 in (3.15 m)	17 reps
All values from Clemson's Pro Day

=== Arizona Cardinals (first stint) ===
==== 2013 ====
Brown went undrafted in the 2013 NFL Draft. On April 29, 2013, the Arizona Cardinals signed Brown to a three-year $1.49 million contract that includes a signing bonus of $10,000.

Throughout training camp, Brown competed for a roster spot against several receivers. He was able to stand out enough and earn his spot as the fourth wide receiver on the depth chart to begin the regular season. He began the season behind Larry Fitzgerald, Michael Floyd, and Andre Roberts.

Brown made his professional regular season debut in the Arizona Cardinals' season-opener at the St. Louis Rams and caught a 14-yard pass during their 27–24 loss. On October 17, 2013, Brown caught a season-high three passes for 30-yards and scored his first career touchdown during a 34–23 loss against the Seattle Seahawks in Week 7. Brown caught his first career touchdown reception on an eight-yard pass during the fourth quarter. Brown finished his rookie season in 2013 with 11 receptions for 140 receiving yards and one touchdown in 16 games and zero starts. He also recorded five combined tackles while appearing on special teams.

==== 2014 ====
During training camp in 2014, Brown competed for a roster spot as the fifth wide receiver on the depth chart against Dan Buckner, Brittan Golden, Walt Powell, Kevin Ozier, and Kelsey Pope. Head coach Bruce Arians named Brown the fifth wide receiver on the Cardinals' depth Chart to begin the regular season, behind Larry Fitzgerald, Michael Floyd, Ted Ginn Jr., and rookie John Brown. On October 5, 2014, Brown earned his first career start during a 41–20 loss at the Denver Broncos in Week 5. On November 30, 2014, Brown made a career-high seven receptions for 75-yards as the Cardinals lost 29–18 at the Atlanta Falcons. The following week, he made two receptions for 48 receiving yards and caught a season-long 26-yard touchdown pass during a 17–14 win against the Kansas City Chiefs in Week 14. He finished the season with 22 receptions for 229 receiving yards and two touchdowns in 16 games and two starts. In addition, he finished third on the team with eight special teams tackles.

The Arizona Cardinals finished second in the NFC West with an 11–5 record and earned a wildcard berth. On January 3, 2015, Brown appeared in his first career playoff game as the Cardinals lost 27–16 at the Carolina Panthers in the NFC Wildcard Game.

==== 2015 ====
Brown retained his role as the fourth wide receiver on the depth chart, behind Larry Fitzgerald, Michael Floyd, and John Brown. On November 15, 2015, Brown caught a season-high three passes for 38-yards during a 39–32 win at the Seattle Seahawks in Week 10. Brown finished the 2015 NFL season with 11 receptions for 144 receiving yards and one touchdown in 16 games and zero starts. The Arizona Cardinals finished first in the NFC West with a 13–3 record and earned a first round bye. On January 24, 2016, Brown started in his first career playoff game and caught one reception for 16-yards during their 49–15 loss at the Carolina Panthers in the NFC Championship Game.

==== 2016 ====
On March 4, 2016, the Arizona Cardinals applied a low qualifying tender offer to Brown as a restricted free agent. On April 18, 2016, Brown officially signed his one-year, $1.67 million restricted free agent tender.

Brown competed against Brittan Golden, Jaxon Shipley, and J. J. Nelson to be the fourth wide receiver throughout training camp. Head coach Bruce Arians named Brown the third wide receiver to begin the regular season after he had an impressive training camp. He remained on the depth chart behind Larry Fitzgerald and Michael Floyd. On September 18, 2016, Brown caught two passes for a season-high 78-yards and one touchdown during a 40–7 win against the Tampa Bay Buccaneers in Week 2. In Week 6, he collected a season-high four receptions for 35-yards during a 28–3 win against the New York Jets. On October 23, 2016, Brown tore his ACL during a 6–6 tie against the Seattle Seahawks in Week 7. On October 25, 2016, the Arizona Cardinals officially placed Brown on injured reserve for the remainder of the season. He finished the season with 11 catches for 187 receiving yards and one touchdown in seven games and two starts.

On November 16, 2016, the Arizona Cardinals signed Brown to a one-year, $1.91 million contract that includes a signing bonus of $635,000.

==== 2017 ====
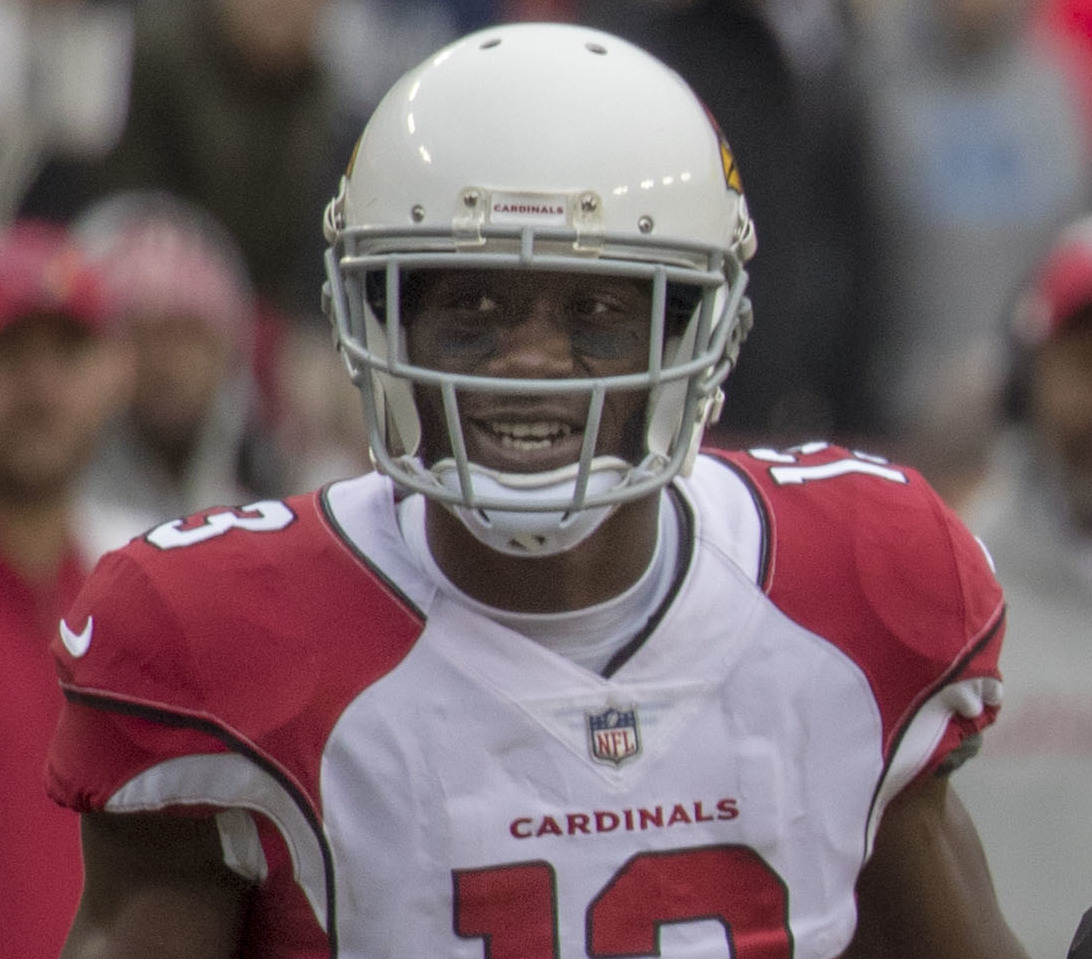
Jaron Brown with the Arizona Cardinals in 2017

Throughout training camp, Brown competed against Chad Williams, Aaron Dobson, J.J. Nelson, and Brittan Golden to be the third wide receiver on the depth chart. Head coach Bruce Arians named Brown the No. 2 starting wide receiver on the depth chart to start the regular season, alongside Larry Fitzgerald.

On October 1, 2017, Brown caught eight passes for a season-high 105 yards during an 18–15 win against the San Francisco 49ers. In Week 12, Brown caught a season-long 52-yard touchdown as the Cardinals defeated the Jacksonville Jaguars 27–24. Brown finished the 2017 NFL season with 31 receptions for 477 receiving yards and four touchdowns in 16 games and eight starts.

=== Seattle Seahawks ===
==== 2018 ====
On March 17, 2018, the Seattle Seahawks signed Brown to a two-year, $5.50 million contract that includes $2.75 million guaranteed and a signing bonus of $1.95 million.

Throughout training camp, Brown competed against Brandon Marshall, Amara Darboh, David Moore, Tanner McEvoy, and Marcus Johnson to be the No. 3 wide receiver after the role was left vacant by the departure of Paul Richardson. Head coach Pete Carroll named Brown the No. 3 wide receiver on the depth chart to begin the regular season, behind Doug Baldwin and Tyler Lockett.

On December 2, 2018, Brown made three receptions for 67-yards and caught two touchdown passes during a 43–16 victory against the San Francisco 49ers in Week 13. It marked the first multi-touchdown game of his career.

==== 2019 ====
On August 31, 2019, Brown was released by the Seattle Seahawks due to the recently signed Jadeveon Clowney to save cap space. However, on September 2, two days after being released, he was re-signed as tight end Ed Dickson was placed on injured reserve. In week 6 against the Cleveland Browns, Brown caught 3 passes for 29 yards and 2 touchdowns in the 32–28 win.

After becoming a free agent in March 2020, Brown had a tryout with the Houston Texans on August 16, 2020.

=== San Francisco 49ers ===
On August 20, 2020, the San Francisco 49ers signed Brown to a one-year contract. He was released on August 27, 2020.

=== Arizona Cardinals (second stint) ===
On September 23, 2020, Brown was signed to the Arizona Cardinals practice squad. He was released on October 13.

== Career statistics ==
=== NFL ===
Year	Team	Games		Receiving					Fumbles	
Year	Team	GP	GS	Rec	Yds	Avg	Lng	TD	Fum	Lost
2013	ARI	16	0	11	140	12.7	32	1	0	0
2014	ARI	16	2	22	229	10.4	26	2	1	0
2015	ARI	16	0	11	144	13.1	39	1	0	0
2016	ARI	7	2	11	187	17.0	51	1	0	0
2017	ARI	16	8	31	477	15.4	52	4	0	0
2018	SEA	16	2	14	166	11.9	45	5	0	0
2019	SEA	14	4	16	220	13.8	48	2	1	1
Total		101	18	116	1,563	13.5	52	16	2	1

=== College ===
Season	Team	Receiving				Rushing			
Season	Team	Rec	Yds	Avg	TD	Att	Yds	Avg	TD
2009	Clemson	3	30	10.0	1	0	0	0.0	0
2010	Clemson	32	405	12.7	3	8	63	7.9	0
2011	Clemson	31	406	13.1	4	0	0	0.0	0
2012	Clemson	21	345	16.4	0	1	3	3.0	0
Total		87	1,186	13.6	8	9	66	7.3	0

== Personal life ==
Jaron was born in Ceiba, Puerto Rico, on Naval Station Roosevelt Roads to parents Norman and Regina Brown. Jaron has one brother, Norman Brown III. Brown, a Navy brat, has lived all over the world. Prior to his father's retirement from the Navy, he moved to his parents' hometown of Cheraw, South Carolina. There, Brown gained recognition as a talented athlete and an excellent student. Recognition gained national attention as Brown was offered 8 full scholarships from Division I schools that included Tennessee, West Virginia, Kentucky, Michigan, Vanderbilt, Duke, South Carolina, and Clemson. While attending Clemson, Brown was an excellent student-athlete, garnering two Academic All-ACC selections and being a four-time ACC Academic Honor Roll member in his time at Clemson University. He graduated on December 22, 2011, with a degree in management. Brown is married to former flight attendant and model Ashley Brown. The couple have a daughter, who was born in 2015.
