= Las Vegas All-American Classic =

Former college football all-star game

Las Vegas All-American Classic (defunct)
- Stadium: Sam Boyd Stadium (2004–2006); Hansen Stadium (2002–2003)
- Location: Las Vegas, Nevada (2004–2006); St. George, Utah (2002–2003)
- Operated: 2002–2006

Former names
- Paradise Bowl (2002–2003); North–South All-American Classic (proposed)

The Las Vegas All-American Classic (formerly the Paradise Bowl) was an annual post-season college football all-star game that was played in January from 2002 to 2006. After taking two years off due to lack of sponsorship, there were plans for the game to return in 2009 as the North–South All-American Classic, but it was postponed and has not been played since.

== History ==
The game was known in 2002 and 2003 as the Paradise Bowl. It was conceived by Darry Alton, in view of the discontinuation of the Blue–Gray Football Classic and the Gridiron Classic, in order to provide players from lesser-known and lesser-televised schools, or players who were primarily backups, with a chance to impress NFL scouts. Alton would later help found the Magnolia Gridiron All-Star Classic.

The Paradise Bowl games were played in St. George, Utah, on the campus of the Dixie State College of Utah at Hansen Stadium. In 2002, the game matched players from schools located in Colorado and Utah (playing as the "Utah-Colorado All-Stars") against players from schools in other Western states (playing as the "West All-Stars"), and in 2003, the game matched players from Midwestern schools ("MidWest All-Stars") against players from Western schools ("West All-Stars").

Starting in 2004, the game was held at Sam Boyd Stadium in Las Vegas, Nevada. With the move, it was renamed the Las Vegas All-American Classic. These games matched a team of players from Division I-A and I-AA schools located east of the Mississippi River (who play as the "East" team) against players from schools located west of the Mississippi (who play as the "West" team). The intent each year was to field teams of about fifty players each, all of whom were NFL draft-eligible (in their junior years or later), with forty to forty-five players from Division I-A schools. Prior to the game, players participated in team practices and combines open to professional scouts. A reception honoring offensive and defensive most valuable players for each team followed the game. The game was televised regionally on Fox Sports Net networks.

The 2007 game was cancelled due to lack of sponsorship. NFL Network, which was scheduled to televise the contest, replaced it with a rebroadcast of Super Bowl XXXII. It was hoped that the game could be revived in 2008 with a new title sponsor, but that did not happen. There were then plans to relocate to Miami with a name change to the North–South All-American Classic and a game date of January 19, 2009, but it was postponed indefinitely.

== Game results ==
Date Played	Name	Winning Team		Losing Team		Ref	Location
January 12, 2002	Paradise Bowl	West All-Stars	33	Utah-Colorado All-Stars	30 (2OT)		St. George, Utah
January 25, 2003	Paradise Bowl	Midwest All-Stars	36	West All-Stars	31		St. George, Utah
January 17, 2004	Las Vegas; All-American Classic	West	14	East	7		Las Vegas, Nevada
January 22, 2005	Las Vegas; All-American Classic	West	21	East	16		Las Vegas, Nevada
January 14, 2006	Las Vegas; All-American Classic	East	41	West	3		Las Vegas, Nevada
January 15, 2007	Las Vegas; All-American Classic	cancelled					Las Vegas, Nevada
January 19, 2009	North–South; All-American Classic	postponed					Miami, Florida

Series records: West (3–2), Midwest (1–0), East (1–2), Utah-Colorado (0–1)

== MVPs ==
- 2002

West – Scott McEwan (QB, UCLA) and Derrick Lewis (WR, SDSU)
UTCO – Dennis Smith (TE, Utah)

- 2003

Overall – Brian Jones (QB, Toledo)
Midwest – Arlen Harris (RB, Hofstra)
West – Michael Oliva (WR, Cal-Davis)
Special Teams – Andrew Amerson (WR/PR, Troy State)

- 2004 – Jason Fife (QB, Oregon)
- 2005

East – DeCori Birmingham (RB, Arkansas) and Eugune Childs (CB, Western Michigan)
West – Darnell Stephens (RB, Air Force) and Antoine Cash (LB, Southern Miss)

- 2006 – Tra Boger (DB, Tulane)

== See also ==
- List of college bowl games
