= Magnolia Gridiron All-Star Classic =

College football all-star game

Magnolia Gridiron All-Star Classic (defunct)
- Stadium: Mississippi Veterans Memorial Stadium
- Location: Jackson, Mississippi
- Operated: 2005–2006

The Magnolia Gridiron All-Star Classic was an annual post-season college football all-star game held in December 2005 and 2006. The game was organized by Darry Alton, who previously helped found the Las Vegas All-American Classic, in view of the discontinuation of the Blue–Gray Football Classic and the Gridiron Classic, in order to provide players from lesser-known and lesser-televised schools with a chance to impress NFL scouts.

The game was held at Mississippi Veterans Memorial Stadium in Jackson, Mississippi. It matched a team of senior players from Division I-A schools not participating in bowl games, against seniors from Division I-AA, Division II, and Division III schools; both teams also included some NAIA players. In advance of the game, players participated in practice days and a combine, which were open to NFL and CFL scouts.

== Game results ==
Date Played	Winning team		Losing team		Ref.
December 24, 2005	White Team (Division I-A)	17	Red Team (smaller schools)	9	
December 23, 2006	Green Team (Division I-A)	32	Red Team (smaller schools)	14	

Head coaches:

2005 – Kentucky offensive coordinator Joker Phillips (White) and Northwestern State head coach Scott Stoker (Red)
2006 – former Mississippi State head coach Jackie Sherrill (Green) and former Jackson State head coach W. C. Gorden (Red)

=== 2005: White 17, Red 9 ===
Scoring summary

Quarter	Time	Drive			Team	Scoring information	Score	
Quarter	Time	Plays	Yards	TOP	Team	Scoring information	White	Red
1	3:24				White	Bill Sampy 41-yard touchdown reception from Matt Bohnet, Justin Brantley kick good	7	0
2	2:05				White	22-yard field goal by Justin Brantley	10	0
2	0:00				Red	Blayne Baggett 1-yard touchdown run, Jon Scifres kick good	10	7
3	12:21	5	74		White	Boone Stutz 7-yard touchdown reception from Steven Jyles, Justin Brantley kick good	17	7
3	6:18				Red	Dustin Almond tackled in end zone for a safety by defense	17	9
"TOP" = time of possession. For other American football terms, see Glossary of American football.							17	9

=== 2006: Green 32, Red 14 ===
Scoring summary

Quarter	Time	Drive			Team	Scoring information	Score	
Quarter	Time	Plays	Yards	TOP	Team	Scoring information	Red	Green
1					Green	47-yard field goal by John Deraney	0	3
1					Green	Demarcus Davis 14-yard touchdown reception from Tim Brasic, John Deraney kick good	0	10
1					Red	Jamal Pittman 1-yard touchdown run, Jim Hall kick good	7†	10
1					Green	Pierre Thomas 1-yard touchdown run, 2-point pass good (Jon Hamlett from Michael Gibson)	7	18
2					Green	Jon Hamlett 19-yard touchdown reception from Jerry Babb, John Deraney kick good	7	25
4					Red	Eldra Buckley 7-yard touchdown run, Jim Hall kick good	14	25
4					Green	Terrell Jordan 11-yard touchdown run, John Deraney kick good	14	32
"TOP" = time of possession. For other American football terms, see Glossary of American football.							14	32

† Game summaries differ from the box score, stating that both Red touchdowns occurred late in the second half.

== MVPs ==
- 2006 – Jerry Babb (QB, Louisiana–Lafayette) and Edgar Jones (LB, Southeast Missouri State)

== See also ==
- List of college bowl games
