= Raycom All-Star Classic =

College football all-star game

Raycom All-Star Classic (defunct)
- Raycom College Football All-Star Classic
- Stadium: Cramton Bowl
- Location: Montgomery, Alabama
- Operated: 2013

The Raycom All-Star Classic was a postseason college football all-star game, the only edition of which took place in 2013. The game was played in Montgomery, Alabama, at the Cramton Bowl and was telecast by CBS Sports Network.

== History ==
Montgomery's Cramton Bowl stadium had hosted the Blue–Gray Football Classic from 1939 to 2001, and the stadium was renovated in 2011. With Raycom Media as a sponsor, the All-Star Classic provided seniors not playing in the Senior Bowl with an opportunity to be seen by scouts in advance of the 2013 NFL draft. Ten players in the game were eventually drafted.

In August 2013, city officials announced that a new traditional bowl game would be played in Montgomery, starting in 2014, between teams from the Sun Belt Conference and Mid-American Conference. As that game, the Camellia Bowl, would be sponsored by Raycom Media and played at the Cramton Bowl, the All-Star Classic was discontinued.

== Game results ==
Date Played	Winning Team		Losing Team		Ref.
January 19, 2013	Stripes	31	Stars	3	

Head coaches

2013 – Jim Bates (Stars) and Dan Reeves (Stripes)

=== 2013: Stripes 31, Stars 3 ===
Scoring summary

Quarter	Time	Drive			Team	Scoring information	Score	
Quarter	Time	Plays	Yards	TOP	Team	Scoring information	Stars	Stripes
1	3:03	14	81	9:--	Stripes	21-yard field goal by Drew Alleman	0	3
2	8:33				Stripes	Michael Hill 2-yard touchdown run, Drew Alleman kick good	0	10
2	0:10				Stars	30-yard field goal by Casey Barth	3	10
3					Stripes	Perry Jones 9-yard touchdown run, Jeremy Shelley kick good	3	17
3					Stripes	Tyron Laughinghouse 13-yard touchdown reception from Robert Marve, Jeremy Shelley kick good	3	24
4	7:59				Stripes	Michael Hill 6-yard touchdown run, Jeremy Shelley kick good	3	31
"TOP" = time of possession. For other American football terms, see Glossary of American football.							3	31

== MVPs ==
- 2013 – Michael Hill (RB, Missouri Western) and Charles James (DB, Charleston Southern)

== See also ==
- List of college bowl games
