= Players All-Star Classic =

College football all-star game

Players All-Star Classic (defunct)
- Battle for the Rock
- Stadium: War Memorial Stadium
- Location: Little Rock, Arkansas
- Operated: 2012

The Players All-Star Classic was a postseason college football all-star game, the only edition of which took place in 2012. The game was played in Little Rock, Arkansas, at War Memorial Stadium and was telecast by Comcast/Charter Sports Southeast and Cox Sports Television. The game provided seniors, from any level of college football, an opportunity to be seen by scouts in advance of the 2012 NFL draft.

== Game results ==
Date Played	Winning Team		Losing Team		Ref.
February 4, 2012	North	24	South	19	

Head coaches

2012 – Martin Bayless (North) and Kurt Schottenheimer (South)

== MVPs ==
- 2012 – Michael Smith (RB, Utah State)

== See also ==
- List of college bowl games
