= College All-Star Bowl =

College football game held in South Carolina, US

College All-Star Bowl (defunct)
- Logo of the 2014 game
- Stadium: Paladin Stadium (2014); Younts Stadium (2013)
- Location: Greenville, South Carolina
- Operated: 2013–2014

Former names
- South Carolina College All-Star Bowl (2013)

The College All-Star Bowl was an annual post-season college football all-star game held in Greenville, South Carolina, in 2013 and 2014. The first game (known as the South Carolina College All-Star Bowl) was played at North Greenville University's Younts Stadium, and the second game was played at Furman University's Paladin Stadium.

== History ==
The game was overseen by Wyatt Sports, with former NFL head coach Sam Wyche as the game's commissioner. The game provided players with exposure to NFL scouts, for consideration in the NFL Draft, and raised money for Meals on Wheels.

The 2013 game featured seniors from "upstate" colleges (Clemson University, Furman University, Gardner–Webb University, Newberry College, North Greenville University, Presbyterian College, and Wofford College) against seniors from "low country" colleges (Benedict College, The Citadel, Charleston Southern University, Coastal Carolina University, South Carolina State University, and the University of South Carolina). College seniors who had played high school football in South Carolina were also eligible. Nine players from the 2013 game later signed NFL contracts. The 2014 game additionally included seniors from the ACC, SEC, and SoCon conferences, and was televised on CBS Sports Network.

Another South Carolina-based game, the Medal of Honor Bowl, was played in January 2014 in Charleston. With the similarity in purpose of the College All-Star Bowl and the Medal of Honor Bowl, in July 2014 it was announced that the College All-Star Bowl would cease operations, and the game's founder would join the Medal of Honor Bowl as director of player development. Later that month, Sam Wyche was announced as a member of the Medal of Honor Bowl's national board of directors.

== Game results ==
Logo of the 2013 game

Date Played	Winning Team		Losing Team		Ref.
March 23, 2013	Upstate	23	Low Country	10	
February 14, 2014	Nationals	12	Americans	6	

Head coaches

Former Clemson head coach Danny Ford coached Upstate and the Nationals, while former South Carolina State coach Willie Jeffries coached Low Country and the Americans.

== MVPs ==
- 2013 – Seth Strickland (QB, South Carolina) and A. J. Jones (LB, North Greenville)
- 2014 – Greg Ducre (CB, Washington)

== See also ==
- List of college bowl games
