= Lakefront Bowl =

NCAA Division III football bowl game

- Smiley Cookie Lakefront Bowl
- Stadium: Schneider Stadium
- Location: Waukesha, Wisconsin
- Operated: 2022–present
- Conference tie-ins: MWC (2022–present); NACC (2022–present)
- Website: lakefrontbowl.com

Sponsors
- Cousins Subs 2022–2024; Smiley Cookie 2025–present

The Lakefront Bowl is an annual NCAA Division III postseason college football bowl game sponsored by Smiley Cookie and established in 2022. The game features teams from the Midwest Conference (MWC) and the Northern Athletics Collegiate Conference (NACC). The team that places highest in each conference's standings and does not qualify for the NCAA Division III playoffs is typically chosen to represent their conference in the Lakefront Bowl.

The inaugural game was held on Saturday, November 19, 2022, at Raabe Stadium (Wauwatosa, Wisconsin) with Monmouth defeating Concordia Wisconsin by a score of 45–20.

== Game results ==
Season	Champion	Runner–up	Score	Location	Source
2022	Monmouth (IL)	Concordia (WI)	45–20	Raabe Stadium (Wauwatosa, Wisconsin)	
2023	Monmouth (IL)	St. Norbert	21–14	Raabe Stadium (Wauwatosa, Wisconsin)	
2024	St. Norbert	Monmouth (IL)	20–14	Raabe Stadium (Wauwatosa, Wisconsin)	
2025	Aurora	Illinois College	49–14	Raabe Stadium (Wauwatosa, Wisconsin)	
2026	Chicago	St. Norbert	28–21	Schneider Stadium (Waukesha, Wisconsin)	

== Appearances by team ==
This list is for all–time appearances in the Smiley Cookie Lakefront Bowl since its inception in 2022.

Rank	Team	Appearances	Record	Last
1	Monmouth (IL)	3	2–1	2024
2	St. Norbert	3	1–2	2026
3	Chicago	1	1–0	2026
4	Aurora	1	1–0	2025
5	Illinois College	1	0–1	2025
6	Concordia (WI)	1	0–1	2022
