= Boca Raton Bowl =

Annual American college football postseason game

- Stadium: Flagler Credit Union Stadium
- Location: Boca Raton, Florida
- Operated: 2014–present
- Conference tie-ins: C-USA, The American, MAC, Mountain West, Sun Belt
- Payout: US$900,000 (2019)
- Website: bocaratonbowl.com

Sponsors
- Marmot (2015); Cheribundi (2017–2019); RoofClaim.com (2020–2023); Bush Brothers and Company (2025)

Former names
- Marmot Boca Raton Bowl (2015); Cheribundi Tart Cherry Boca Raton Bowl (2017); Cheribundi Boca Raton Bowl (2018–2019); RoofClaim.com Boca Raton Bowl (2020–2023); Bush's Boca Raton Bowl of Beans (2025)

2025 matchup
- Toledo vs. Louisville (Louisville 27–22)

The Boca Raton Bowl is an annual National Collegiate Athletic Association (NCAA) sanctioned post-season Division I Football Bowl Subdivision (FBS) college football bowl game played in Boca Raton, Florida, since December 2014 on the campus of Florida Atlantic University (FAU) at FAU Stadium. Winners of the game received the Howard Schnellenberger championship trophy, named for the football head coach at FAU from 2001 to 2011.

== History ==
The bowl was founded on October 10, 2013, and was first played in December 2014 as one of the 2014–15 bowl games.

The bowl is owned and operated by ESPN Events, in partnership with Good Karma Brands (owner of the local ESPN Radio affiliate WESP). On October 6, 2015, Marmot, an outdoor clothing and sporting goods company, was announced as the title sponsor of the game. On December 1, 2017, Cheribundi, a New York–based beverage company, was announced as the new title sponsor. From 2020 through 2023, the bowl was sponsored by RoofClaim.com. On November 20, 2025, Bush Brothers and Company was announced as the new title sponsor, rebranding the game as the Bush's Boca Raton Bowl of Beans. The deal expired after the 2025 season.

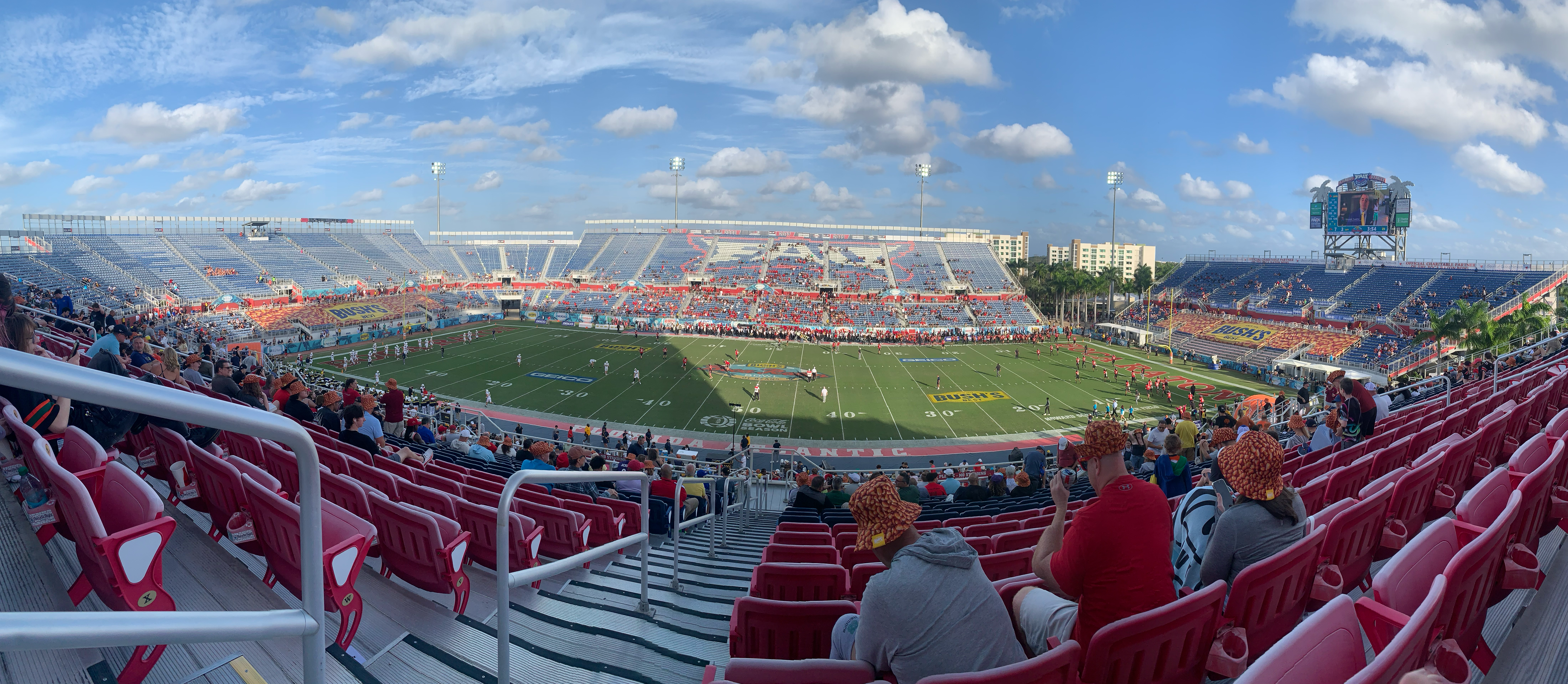
Panoramic photograph of the 2025 Boca Raton Bowl mid-game

== Conference tie-ins ==
The bowl had a tie-in with the Mid-American Conference (MAC) for 2014 and 2015, to face opponents from Conference USA (C-USA) in the first year and the American Athletic Conference (The American) in the second.

In 2014, Northern Illinois, winner of the 2014 MAC Championship Game, was sent as the conference's representative, while C-USA also sent its champion, Marshall. The MAC and C-USA did not have automatic bowl bids for their champions entering 2014; C-USA had lost its contract with the Liberty Bowl, while the Little Caesars Pizza Bowl, which usually took the MAC champion, was discontinued after its 2013 playing and the GoDaddy Bowl, which takes a MAC team and has the option to take the conference champion if it desires, did not invite Marshall. In 2015, the MAC sent Toledo and The American sent Temple.

In 2016 and 2017, C-USA and The American had primary tie-ins with the bowl. In 2016, C-USA sent Western Kentucky and The American sent Memphis. In 2017, C-USA sent Florida Atlantic while their opponent, Akron, came from the MAC. A C-USA vs. MAC matchup was again featured in 2018. The "affiliated conferences" for the 2019 game were The American, C-USA and MAC.

== Game results ==
All rankings per the AP poll, prior to the game being played.

Date	Winning team		Losing team		Attendance	Notes
December 23, 2014	Marshall	52	Northern Illinois	23	29,419	notes
December 22, 2015	Toledo	32	24 Temple	17	25,908	notes
December 20, 2016	Western Kentucky	51	Memphis	31	24,726	notes
December 19, 2017	Florida Atlantic	50	Akron	3	25,912	notes
December 18, 2018	UAB	37	Northern Illinois	13	22,614	notes
December 21, 2019	Florida Atlantic	52	SMU	28	23,187	notes
December 22, 2020	13 BYU	49	UCF	23	6,000	notes
December 18, 2021	Western Kentucky	59	Appalachian State	38	15,429	notes
December 20, 2022	Toledo	21	Liberty	19	20,622	notes
December 21, 2023	South Florida	45	Syracuse	0	20,711	notes
December 18, 2024	James Madison	27	Western Kentucky	17	15,808	notes
December 23, 2025	Louisville	27	Toledo	22	15,329	notes

== MVPs ==
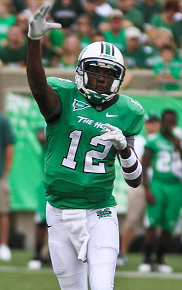
2014 MVP Rakeem Cato

The number of players honored as MVPs has varied.

Year	Offense			Defense			Special Teams			Ref.
Year	Player	Pos.	Team	Player	Pos.	Team	Player	Pos.	Team	Ref.
2014	Rakeem Cato	QB	Marshall							
2015	Phillip Ely	QB	Toledo	Ju'Wan Woodley	LB	Toledo				
2016	Anthony Wales	RB	Western Kentucky	Keith Brown	LB	Western Kentucky				
2017	Jason Driskel	QB	Florida Atlantic	Azeez Al-Shaair	LB	Florida Atlantic				
2018	Xavier Ubosi	WR	UAB	Anthony Rush	NT	UAB				
2019	Chris Robison	QB	Florida Atlantic	Rashad Smith	LB	Florida Atlantic	Matt Hayball	P	Florida Atlantic	
2020	Zach Wilson	QB	BYU	Keenan Pili	LB	BYU	Caleb Christensen	KR	BYU	
2021	Bailey Zappe	QB	Western Kentucky	Antwon Kincade	DB	Western Kentucky	John Haggerty III	P	Western Kentucky	
2022	Dequan Finn	QB	Toledo	Nate Givhan	LB	Toledo	Thomas Cluckey	K	Toledo	
2023	Byrum Brown	QB	South Florida	Daquan Evans	DB	South Florida	Aamaris Brown	DB	South Florida	
2024	JC Evans	QB	James Madison	DJ Barksdale	NB	James Madison	Ryan Hanson	P	James Madison	
2025	Miller Moss	QB	Louisville	Clev Lubin	DE	Louisville	David Chapeau	K	Louisville	

== Most appearances ==
Updated through the December 2025 edition (12 games, 24 total appearances).

Teams with multiple appearances

Rank	Team	Appearances	Record	Win pct.
1	Toledo	3	2–1	0.667
1	Western Kentucky	3	2–1	0.667
3	Florida Atlantic	2	2–0	1.000
3	Northern Illinois	2	0–2	0.000

Teams with a single appearance

Won (6): BYU, James Madison, Louisville, Marshall, South Florida, UAB
Lost (8): Akron, Appalachian State, Liberty, Memphis, SMU, Syracuse, Temple, UCF

== Appearances by conference ==
Updated through the December 2025 edition (12 games, 24 total appearances).

Conference	Record				Appearances by season	
Conference	Games	W	L	Win pct.	Won	Lost
CUSA	7	6	1	.857	2014, 2016, 2017, 2018, 2019, 2021	2024
MAC	6	2	4	.333	2015, 2022	2014, 2017, 2018, 2025
American	5	1	4	.200	2023	2015, 2016, 2019, 2020
Independents	2	1	1	.500	2020	2022
ACC	2	1	1	.500	2025	2023
Sun Belt	2	1	1	.500	2024	2021

Independent appearances: BYU (2020), Liberty (2022)

== Game records ==
Team	Record, Team vs. Opponent	Year
Most points scored (one team)	59, Western Kentucky vs. Appalachian State	2021
Most points scored (losing team)	38, Appalachian State vs. Western Kentucky	2021
Most points scored (both teams)	97, Western Kentucky vs. Appalachian State	2021
Fewest points allowed	0, South Florida vs. Syracuse	2023
Largest margin of victory	47, Florida Atlantic vs. Akron	2017
Total yards	655, BYU vs. UCF	2020
Rushing yards	312, Florida Atlantic vs. Akron	2017
Passing yards	441, BYU vs. UCF	2020
First downs	34, BYU vs. UCF	2020
Fewest yards allowed	146, Florida Atlantic vs. Akron	2017
Fewest rushing yards allowed	16, James Madison vs. Western Kentucky	2024
Fewest passing yards allowed	77, Florida Atlantic vs. Akron	2017
Individual	Record, Player, Team	Year
All-purpose yards	329, Anthony Wales (Western Kentucky)	2016
Touchdowns (all-purpose)	3, most recent: Jerreth Sterns (Western Kentucky)	2021
Rushing yards	245, Anthony Wales (Western Kentucky)	2016
Rushing touchdowns	3, shared by: Anthony Wales (Western Kentucky); Devin Singletary (Florida Atlantic)	2016; 2017
Passing yards	425, Zach Wilson (BYU)	2020
Passing touchdowns	6, Bailey Zappe (Western Kentucky)	2021
Receptions	18, Tommy Shuler (Marshall)	2014
Receiving yards	227, Xavier Ubosi (UAB)	2018
Receiving touchdowns	3, shared by Anthony Miller (Memphis); Xavier Ubosi (UAB); Jerreth Sterns (Western Kentucky)	2016; 2018; 2021
Tackles	16, Mike Smith Jr (Liberty)	2022
Sacks	3.0, shared by: Arthur Maulet (Memphis); Nick Dawson (Western Kentucky)	2016
Interceptions	1, most recent: Jacquez Williams (South Florida); Tavin Ward (South Florida)	2023
Long Plays	Record, Player, Team	Year
Touchdown run	86 yds., Noah Whittington (Western Kentucky)	2021
Touchdown pass	80 yds., Cody Thompson (Toledo)	2015
Kickoff return	93 yds., Deandre Reaves (Marshall)	2014
Punt return	24 yds., Jalen Young (Florida Atlantic)	2017
Interception return	22 yds., Rashad Smith (Florida Atlantic)	2019
Fumble return	64 yds., Aamaris Brown (South Florida)	2023
Punt	71 yds., Alex Starzyk (Temple)	2015
Field goal	50 yds., Robert Hammond III (Toledo)	2025

== Media coverage ==
The bowl has been televised by ESPN since its inception, with the 2019 edition broadcast on ABC.

== Legends honorees ==
Each December, the bowl recognizes one person associated with football in the state of Florida with the Palm Beach County Football Legends Award.

Year	Honoree	Role	Florida team	Ref.
2014	Howard Schnellenberger	College & NFL head coach	Florida Atlantic Owls	
2015	Reidel Anthony	College & NFL wide receiver	Florida Gators	
2016	John Carney	College & NFL placekicker	Cardinal Newman High School	
2017	Steve Walsh	College & NFL quarterback; High School & CFL coach	Miami Hurricanes	
2018	Brad Banks	College & CFL quarterback; 2002 Heisman Trophy runner-up	Glades Central High School	
2019	Santonio Holmes	College & NFL wide receiver; Super Bowl XLIII MVP	Glades Central High School	
2021	Pierre Garçon	College & NFL wide receiver	John I. Leonard High School	
2022	Jacoby Ford	College & NFL wide receiver	Cardinal Newman High School	
2023	Anthony Carter	College & NFL wide receiver	Suncoast High School	
2024	Jon Bostic	College & NFL linebacker	Palm Beach Central High School	
