= Share Bowl =

Share Bowl (defunct)
- Previous locations: Knoxville, Tennessee (1971)
- Operated: 1971

1971 matchup
- Carson–Newman vs Fairmont State (54–3)

The Share Bowl was an American college football bowl game played on December 11, 1971, in Knoxville, Tennessee. The Carson–Newman Eagles defeated the Fairmont State Fighting Falcons.
