= Medal of Honor Bowl =

Medal of Honor Bowl (defunct)
- Stadium: Johnson Hagood Stadium
- Location: Charleston, South Carolina
- Operated: 2014–2015

Former names
- Legends Bowl (proposed)

The Medal of Honor Bowl was an American college football all-star game played in Charleston, South Carolina, in January 2014 and 2015. The bowl was not sanctioned by the National Collegiate Athletic Association (NCAA). Primary beneficiaries of the game were the Medal of Honor Museum on the aircraft carrier USS Yorktown and, initially, the Wounded Warrior Project.

== Background ==
In 2004, Tommy McQueeney, a former Citadel Board of Visitors member, led an ownership group interested in starting a Charleston-based college bowl game, the "Palmetto Bowl", but was blocked by an NCAA ban on playing postseason games at pre-determined locations in South Carolina due to the Confederate battle flag being flown at a civil war monument on the State House grounds.

== History ==
The Charleston-based bowl attempt was revived as a proposed "Legends Bowl" to begin in 2014 at The Citadel's Johnson Hagood Stadium featuring teams from the Sun Belt and Mid-American conferences, with NBCSN as its broadcasting partner.

The Medal of Honor Bowl was announced by organizers in October 2013, as a college football all-star game in place of the proposed Legends Bowl. The game would not require the NCAA bowl committee's approval, by inviting players who have exhausted their college eligibility. The first game was scheduled for January 11, 2014, at Johnson Hagood Stadium with the expectation of drawing players from SEC and ACC conferences. Organizers reached a five-year agreement with The Citadel for use of its stadium.

The American and National teams for 2014 were chosen from a pool of 300 players by the bowl's executive director, who looked for players with profiles expected to fill NFL draft needs in the fourth to seventh rounds. Pro Player Insiders ranked college football all-star games in September 2014, placing this game fourth. At that time, 64 players from the bowl had been drafted, signed, or had a tryout with an NFL team; there were 7 players on active rosters, 16 players on practice squads, and 2 players on injured reserve. In October 2014, the bowl announced that NBCSN would broadcast the next game on January 10, 2015, starting at 2:30 PM.

Another South Carolina-based game, the College All-Star Bowl, had started in 2013, and was played twice in Greenville. With the similarity in purpose of the College All-Star Bowl and the Medal of Honor Bowl, in July 2014 it was announced that the College All-Star Bowl would cease operations, and that game's founder would join the Medal of Honor Bowl as director of player development. Later that month, Sam Wyche, a College All-Star Bowl board member, was announced as a member of the Medal of Honor Bowl's national board of directors.

On August 27, 2015, after the NCAA lifted its ban on playing postseason games at pre-determined locations in South Carolina (following the State House's July 2015 removal of the Confederate battle flag), bowl organizers announced their intent to apply for NCAA sanctioning as a traditional postseason bowl game featuring FBS college teams, with a tentative game date of December 18, 2016. However, in April 2016, the NCAA announced a moratorium on new bowl games.

Medal of Honor Bowl organizers tentatively set a date of January 7, 2017, for playing the game under its prior all-star format. In September 2016, organizers announced that the bowl would be suspended, due to Johnson Hagood Stadium having "myriad issues related to structural integrity and lead paint mitigation." The announcement included cancellation of the game tentatively planned for January 7, 2017, and a new tentative date of January 13, 2018. As of May 2017, significant renovation work was underway at Johnson Hagood Stadium. As of early January 2018, there have been no press releases or recent updates to the official website; the bowl appears to be on indefinite hold.

== Game results ==
Date	American		National		Attendance	Ref.
Date	Coach	Score	Coach	Score	Attendance	Ref.
January 11, 2014	Ralph Friedgen	20	Chan Gailey	3	5,135	
January 10, 2015	Willie Jeffries	14	Chan Gailey	26	12,578	
January 7, 2017	cancelled					
January 13, 2018	proposed, but not played					

=== 2014: American 20, National 3 ===
Scoring summary

Quarter	Time	Drive			Team	Scoring information	Score	
Quarter	Time	Plays	Yards	TOP	Team	Scoring information	National	American
1	9:03	7	60	4:13	American	Danny O'Brien 1-yard touchdown run, Michael Pallardy kick failed	0	6
2	14:04	10	42	5:11	National	40-yard field goal by Drew Basil	3	6
2	8:09	8	50	4:42	American	D.J. Adams 19-yard touchdown run, Michael Pallardy kick good	3	13
4	13:49	9	51	5:00	American	D.J. Adams 1-yard touchdown run, Michael Pallardy kick good	3	20
"TOP" = time of possession. For other American football terms, see Glossary of American football.							3	20

=== 2015: National 26, American 14 ===
Scoring summary

Quarter	Time	Drive			Team	Scoring information	Score	
Quarter	Time	Plays	Yards	TOP	Team	Scoring information	National	American
1	8:46				American	Synjyn Days 5-yard touchdown run, Ty Long kick good	0	7
1					National	27-yard field goal by Will Conant	3	7
2	14:46				American	Interception returned 87 yards for touchdown by Quinn Backus, Ty Long kick good	3	14
2					National	21-yard field goal by Will Conant	6	14
3					National	33-yard field goal by Will Conant	9	14
3	5:02				National	Damiere Byrd 11-yard touchdown reception from Ryan Williams, Will Conant kick good	16	14
3	1:28				National	36-yard field goal by Will Conant	19	14
4	8:35				National	Interception returned 52 yards for touchdown by Brison Williams, Will Conant kick good	26	14
"TOP" = time of possession. For other American football terms, see Glossary of American football.							26	14

== MVPs ==
Date	American			National			Ref.
Date	Player	Pos.	College	Player	Pos.	College	Ref.
January 11, 2014	Solomon Patton	WR	Florida	Deon Furr	LB	Fort Valley State	
January 10, 2015	Quinn Backus	LB	Coastal Carolina	Ryan Williams	QB	Miami (FL)	
