= Michael Hill (American football) =

American football player (born 1989)

No. 34, 44, 23
- Position: Running back

Personal information
- Born: August 14, 1989 (age 37); St. Joseph, Missouri, U.S.
- Listed height: 5 ft 10 in (1.78 m)
- Listed weight: 210 lb (95 kg)

Career information
- High school: Central (St. Joseph)
- College: Missouri Western
- NFL draft: 2013: undrafted

Career history
- San Diego Chargers (2013)*; Green Bay Packers (2013); Tampa Bay Buccaneers (2013); Green Bay Packers (2014)*; Indianapolis Colts (2014)*; Washington Redskins (2014)*; Indianapolis Colts (2014); Washington Redskins (2015)*; Dallas Cowboys (2015)
- * Offseason or practice squad member only

Career NFL statistics
- Rushing attempts: 9
- Rushing yards: 23
- Receptions: 2
- Receiving yards: 23
- Stats at Pro Football Reference

Michael Hill (born May 14, 1989) is an American former professional football player who was a running back in the National Football League (NFL). He played college football for the Missouri Western Griffons. He was signed as an undrafted free agent by the San Diego Chargers in 2013.

== Professional career ==
=== San Diego Chargers ===
On April 27, 2013, Hill signed with the San Diego Chargers as an undrafted free agent. On August 31, 2013, Hill was released by the Chargers.

=== Green Bay Packers ===
On September 2, 2013, Hill was signed the Packers' practice squad. On September 30, 2013, Hill was signed to the Packers' active roster. Hill was waived by the Packers on October 18, 2013.

Hill was re-signed to the Packers' practice squad on October 22, 2013 after clearing waivers.

=== Tampa Bay Buccaneers ===
Hill was signed by the Tampa Bay Buccaneers off the Packers practice squad on November 13, 2013.

=== Green Bay Packers ===
Hill returned to the Green Bay Packers for the 2014 offseason and was later released from the Green Bay Packers practice squad on November 5, 2014.

=== Indianapolis Colts ===
Hill was signed to the practice squad of the Indianapolis Colts on November 18, 2014. He was released by the Colts on November 25, 2014.

=== Washington Redskins ===
The Washington Redskins signed Hill to their practice squad on December 9, 2014.

=== Return to Indianapolis ===
On January 6, 2015, Hill signed with the Colts. He was waived on March 12.

=== Return to Washington ===
He re-signed with the Redskins on March 30, 2015. He was released on July 23, 2015.

=== Dallas Cowboys ===
On August 15, 2015, Hill signed a deal with the Dallas Cowboys. On September 1, 2015, he was waived/injured by the Cowboys. On the following day, he cleared waivers and was reverted to the Cowboys' injured reserve list.
