= Cheribundi =

Cherry drink company

- Company type: Privately held company
- Industry: Foods
- Founded: 2004
- Founder: John Davey
- Headquarters: Portland, OR
- Products: Cheribundi tart cherry juice and juice concentrates
- Website: Cheribundi.com

Cheribundi is a Boulder, Colorado-based private manufacturer of Cheribundi brand tart cherry juice beverages and concentrates. Tart cherry juice is marketed to amateur and professional athletes for its natural concentrations of phyto-nutrients and antioxidants, reportedly beneficial in reducing muscle soreness and joint inflammation.

The company was founded in 2004 by John Davey.

== History ==
Cheribundi was initially founded as CherryPharm in 2004 by John Davey, a Wall Street banker who quit his job in 2006 to focus on the cherry drink startup. He worked with Cornell University food scientist Olga Padilla-Zakour, the director of Cornell's Food Venture Center (FVC) in Geneva, to develop an all-natural tart cherry juice. The resulting product was named CherryPharm, and the drink retained what are believed to be pain-prevention and muscle-damage recovery properties of sour cherries. The company began manufacturing its juice at the Cornell Agriculture and Food Technology Park at the FVC in Geneva.

From 2009 to 2013, Brian Ross served as CEO.

In May 2012, the company closed a $4.5M round of equity funding, and was by then being reportedly carried by 3,000 grocery stores. Later that year, CherryPharm rebranded as Cheribundi.

In 2013, the company hired Steve Pear as CEO. Pear previously worked at Odwalla, part of the Coca-Cola company.

In 2016, the company invested more than $4 million to relocate its facilities to the former Tops Friendly Markets on New York State Routes 5 and 20, directly creating 35 new jobs as part of the "Finger Lakes Forward" initiative.

In 2017, the company moved into its new Geneva location.

In June 2019, the company announced Mike Hagan would be taking over as CEO.

In January 2020, the company announced it was moving manufacturing to Shelby, Michigan. In February, it was announced that the company was contracting manufacturing to Shelby-based fruit processor Peterson Farms, to reduce processing costs and for easier access to Michigan's Montmorency tart cherries. In September, the company announced that CEO Mike Hagan had left the company, and that the CEO role was not going to be immediately filled. In November, the company raised $15 million in a Series B funding round led by private investment firm Emil Capital Partners.

In April 2022, Cheribundi announced Deebo Samuel, Lindsey Horan, Tyrese Haliburton, and Michaela Onyenwere as the brand's first-ever athlete investors.

== Products ==
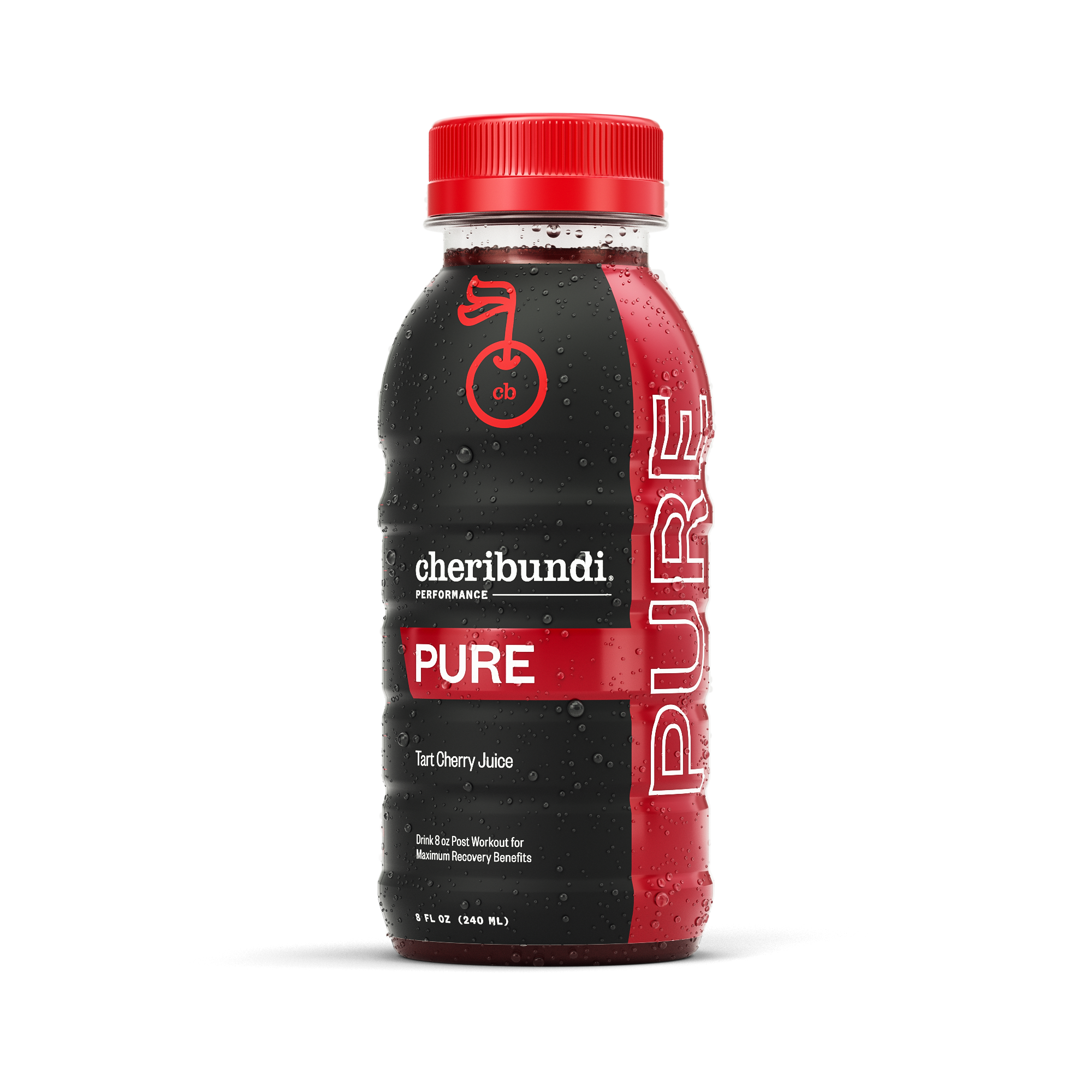
Bottle of Cheribundi tart cherry juice

The company's main product line is tart cherry juice, with the original version containing 200 cherries per 32 fluid ounces, and 160 cherries in the "light" version. Cheribundi's 100% Tart version contains one ingredient (tart cherries), is not from concentrate, and has no added sugars. Juice is distributed in 8 and 32-ounce bottles. In 2021, the company introduced tart cherry juice concentrates, available in convenient, on-the-go pouches and 32-ounce bottles.

The positive effects of tart cherry juice are thought to be the result of phyto-nutrients and antioxidants, such as anthocyanins, melatonin and quercetin. These compounds occur naturally and are in high proportion in deeply colored fruits, such as tart cherries.

Cheribundi is distributed at stores across the United States, including retailers such as Wegman's, Publix, Kroger, Safeway, Meijer, and Whole Foods. In addition to online sales, the company sells to over 400 professional and collegiate sports teams, including the Anaheim Angels, Boston Red Sox, New York Giants, New York Knicks, New York Mets and New York Rangers.

== Research ==
Tart cherries similar to those used in Cheribundi drinks have been the subject of much research, with studies conducted by third parties and research institutions including the British Journal of Sports Medicine, the Journal of Nutrition, Louisiana State University, Baton Rouge, the VA Medical Center, and the University of Pennsylvania. Researchers at Oregon Health & Science University studied tart cherries and found cherry juice could replace nonsteroidal anti-inflammatories, without triggering side effects, including gastrointestinal bleeding. The company has promoted these studies as indicating that consumers of their beverages will receive a wide range of health benefits against muscle fatigue and joint inflammation. Consuming Montmorency cherries, used to make Cheribundi, also reportedly improves gut health by stimulating the growth of good bacteria.

== Corporate sponsorships ==
Cheribundi was the title sponsor of the Boca Raton Bowl, an NCAA College Football bowl game, through the 2019 season. The company has also partnered with the team nutritionists of sports teams, and has sponsored professional athletes such as Aly Raisman, the McCourty Twins, Devin McCourty and Jason McCourty, Team Crossfit Mayhem and Mayhem Teams, and Trey Wingo, host of ESPN Golic and Wingo, NFL PrimeTime, and SportsCenter specials on ESPN. Cheribundi was also the official juice partner of the Arthritis Foundation's "Let’s Get a Grip on Arthritis" and is a sponsor of the Collegiate and Professional Sports Dietitians Association (CPSDA).
