= Gridiron Classic (1999–2005) =

Gridiron Classic (defunct)
- Stadium: Citrus Bowl (1999–2003); The Villages Polo Stadium (2004–05)
- Location: Orlando, Florida (1999–2003); The Villages, Florida (2004–05)
- Operated: 1999–2005

Sponsors
- Tyco (1999–2002); Rotary International (1999–2003); The Villages (2004–05)

The Gridiron Classic, also known as the Rotary Gridiron Classic presented by Tyco and later The Villages Gridiron Classic for sponsorship reasons, was a post-season college football all-star game played each January in Florida from 1999 through 2005.

From 1999 to 2003, it featured a team representing Florida versus a team from the rest of the United States; it was played at the Citrus Bowl in Orlando. In 2004 and 2005, it was played at The Villages Polo Stadium in The Villages, a retirement community approximately 45 miles (72 km) northwest of Orlando. During the two years at The Villages, the game used a North vs. South format.

On August 19, 2005, game organizers Florida Citrus Sports canceled the 2006 playing of the Gridiron Classic, after failing to find a sponsor once The Villages decided not to renew the annual game at their facility. The game has not resumed since.

== Game results ==
Date	Winning team		Losing team		Attendance	Venue
January 16, 1999	Team Florida	17	Team USA	9	29,725	Citrus Bowl; Orlando, Florida
January 29, 2000	Team USA	21	Team Florida	14	21,298	Citrus Bowl; Orlando, Florida
January 13, 2001	Team Florida	10	Team USA	0	20,958	Citrus Bowl; Orlando, Florida
January 26, 2002	Team Florida	42	Team USA	13	20,344	Citrus Bowl; Orlando, Florida
January 25, 2003	Team USA	20	Team Florida	17	9,375	Citrus Bowl; Orlando, Florida
January 31, 2004	North All-Stars	35	South All-Stars	31	12,312	The Villages Polo Stadium; The Villages, Florida
January 15, 2005	South All-Stars	24	North All-Stars	21	12,635	The Villages Polo Stadium; The Villages, Florida

- All-time series: Team Florida over Team USA (3–2); North and South tied (1–1).

== MVPs ==
Year	Player	Pos	College	Type	Ref
1999	Daunte Culpepper; Paul Miranda	QB; CB	Central Florida; Central Florida	Offensive & Overall; Defensive	
2000	JaJuan Dawson; Anthony Midget	WR; S	Tulane; Virginia Tech	Offensive; Defensive	
2001	Rashard Casey; Chris Edmonds	QB; LB	Penn State; West Virginia	Offensive & Overall; Defensive	
2002	Chad Hayes; Mel Mitchell	TE; S	Maine; Western Kentucky	Offensive; Defensive & Overall	
2003	Jonathan Ruffin	PK	Cincinnati	Overall	
2004	Troy Fleming	RB	Tennessee	Overall	
2005	Marcus Randall	QB	LSU	Overall	

== See also ==
- List of college bowl games
