= Smiley Cookie =

Cookie brand in Homestead, Pennsylvania

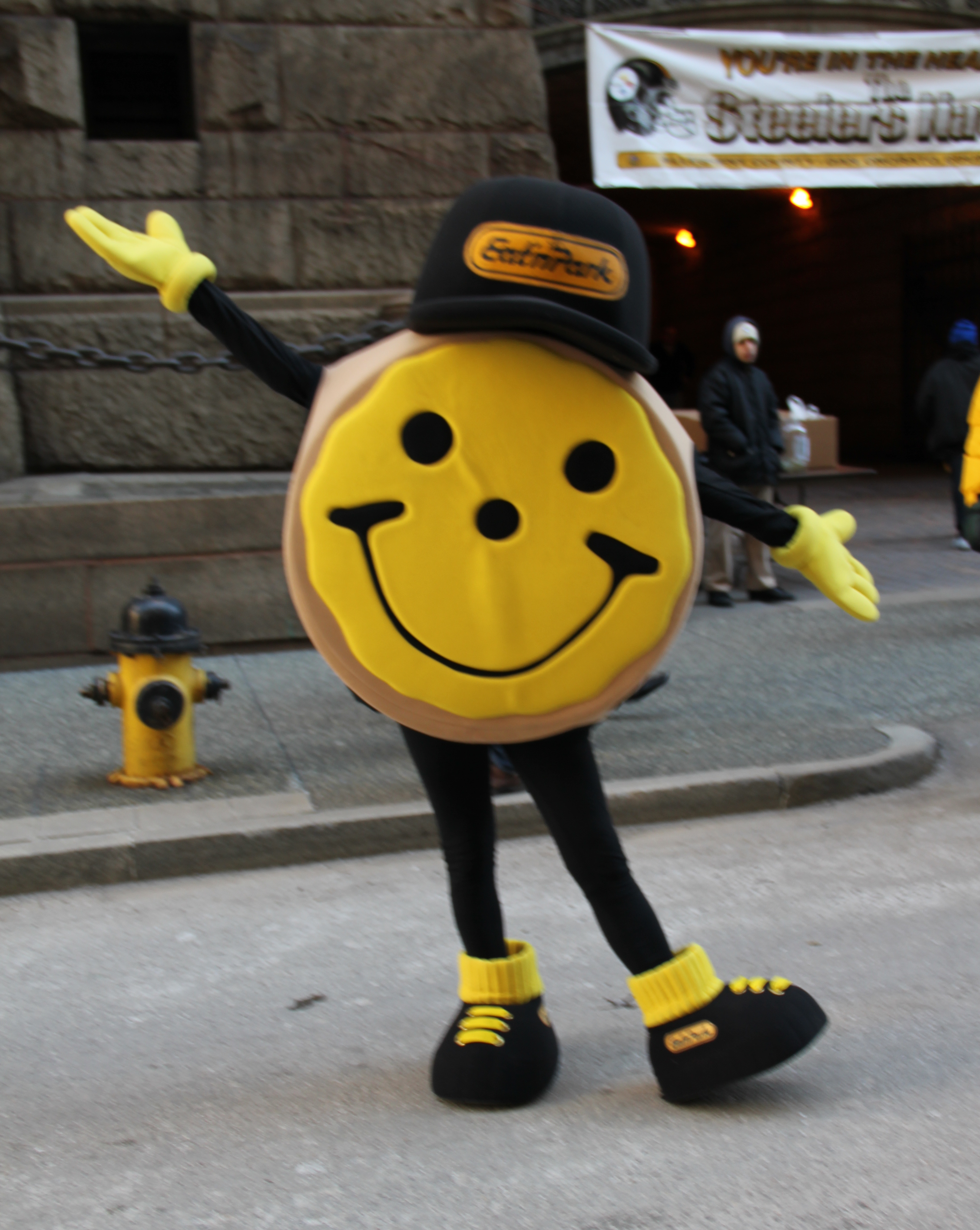
- A black and gold Smiley Cookie appears at a rally for the Pittsburgh Steelers in 2011.
- Place of origin: United States
- Region or state: Western Pennsylvania

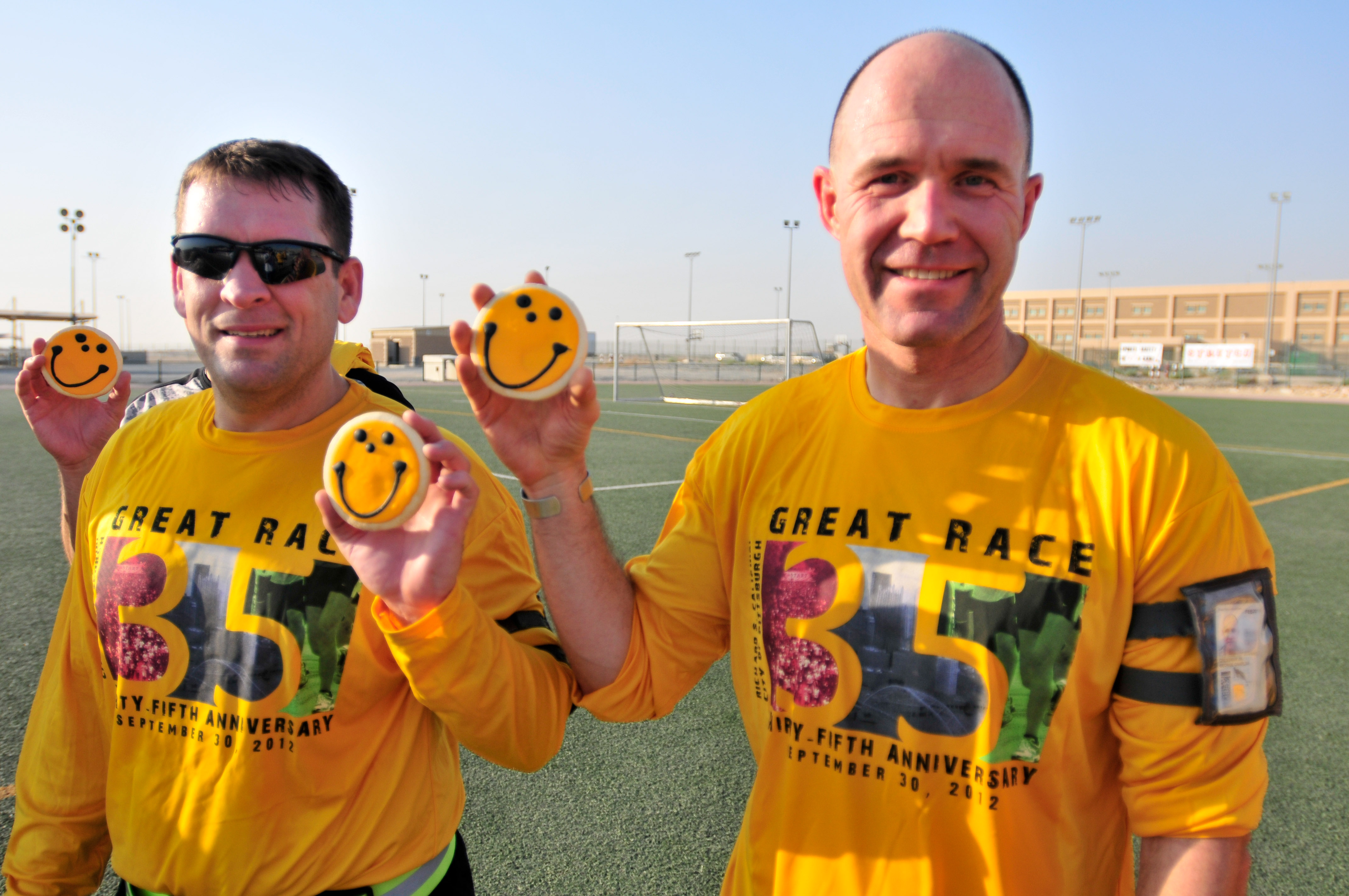
Some Pittsburghers showing off their Smiley cookies in Kuwait

The Smiley cookie is a trademarked cookie that is distributed by the Eat'n Park Corporation of Homestead, Pennsylvania through their restaurants and online business, smileycookie.com.

The signature Smiley Cookie was adapted from a cookie an employee enjoyed as a child in Western PA. Eat'n Park began baking their version in 1986 and coincided with the addition of in-store bakeries at its locations. The Smiley Cookie was first produced by Warner's Bakery, a small bakery in Titusville, Pennsylvania. It was trademarked in 1987. The Smiley Cookie became so popular that it was added to the logo of Eat'n Park. A competitor, Kings Family Restaurants produced the "Frownie", a brownie decorated with a frowning face. The "Frownie" was discontinued in 2015 (later returned in early 2019) after Kings was sold to a private equity firm. The costumed Smiley cookie made appearances throughout the Pittsburgh region and travels in a 1974 DIVCO Milk truck, which is now a branded-van known as the "Cookie Cruiser".

Eat'n Park filed several lawsuits against companies outside the restaurants' operating area to enforce its trademark on the Smiley Cookie.

On December 31, 2010, the Eat'n Park corporation filed a federal lawsuit in Texas against Crumb Corps for infringing on the trademarked cookie.

In 2024, Eat'n Park sent a cease and desist letter to McArthur’s Bakery and The Pioneer Cafe in St. Louis. The bakery, which serves as a training facility for disabled adults, was accused of infringing on Eat'n Park's Smiley Cookies.
