= List of FIU Panthers head football coaches =

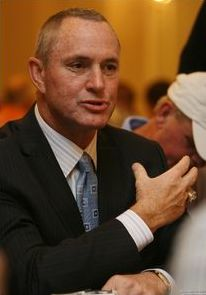
Butch Davis the former head coach of the Panthers.

The FIU Panthers college football team represents Florida International University (FIU) in the East Division of Conference USA (C-USA). The Panthers compete as part of the National Collegiate Athletic Association (NCAA) Division I Football Bowl Subdivision. The program has had six full-time head coaches, and one interim head coach since it began play during the 2002 season. Willie Simmons has served as the FIU head coach since December 2024.

The team has played in 283 games over 24 seasons. In that time, only two Head Coaches have led the Panthers to postseason bowl games: Mario Cristobal and Butch Davis. FIU has a 2–2 record in four bowl games in which they have competed. The Panthers have been Co-Conference Champions once: in 2010 by Cristobal, during the Panthers' time in the Sun Belt Conference.

Cristobal spent the most seasons as the Panthers head coach and took the program to its only bowl games until Davis. The highest winning percentage by any coach is by Butch Davis, and the lowest winning percentage for any coach is Ron Turner, who went 10-30 (.250) in four seasons.

== Key ==
Key to symbols in coaches list
General		Overall		Conference		Postseason (Note: Although the first Rose Bowl Game was played in 1902, it has been continuously played since the 1916 game, and is recognized as the oldest bowl game by the NCAA. "—" indicates any season prior to 1916 when postseason games were not played.)	
No.	Order of coaches (Note: A running total of the number of head coaches, with coaches who served separate tenures being counted only once. Interim head coaches are represented with "Int" and are not counted in the running total. "—" indicates the team played but either without a coach or no coach is on record. "X" indicates an interim year without play.)	GC	Games coached	CW	Conference wins	PW	Postseason wins
DC	Division championships	OW	Overall wins	CL	Conference losses	PL	Postseason losses
CC	Conference championships	OL	Overall losses	CT	Conference ties	PT	Postseason ties
NC	National championships	OT	Overall ties (Note: Overtime rules in college football were introduced in 1996, making ties impossible in the period since.)	C%	Conference winning percentage		
†	Elected to the College Football Hall of Fame	O%	Overall winning percentage (Note: When computing the win–loss percentage, a tie counts as half a win and half a loss.)				

== List of head coaches ==
List of head football coaches showing season(s) coached, overall records, conference records, postseason records, championships and selected awards (Note: Statistics correct as of the end of the 2025 NCAA Division I FBS football season.)
No.	Name	Term	GC	OW	OL	O%	CW	CL	C%	PW	PL	DC (Note: FIU has competed as a member of the East Division of the CUSA.)	CC	NC
1	Don Strock	2002–2006	56	15	41	.268	3	11	.214	0	0	—	0	0
2	Mario Cristobal	2007–2012	74	27	47	.365	20	26	.435	1	1	—	1	0
3	Ron Turner	2013–2016	40	10	30	.250	7	17	.292	0	0	0	0	0
Int.	Ron Cooper	2016	8	4	4	.500	4	4	.500	0	0	0	0	0
4	Butch Davis	2017–2021	56	24	32	.429	14	21	.400	1	1	0	0	0
5	Mike MacIntyre	2022–2024	36	12	24	.333	6	18	.250	0	0	0	0	0
6	Willie Simmons	2025–present	13	7	6	0.538	5	3	0.625	0	1	0	0	0
