= Mario Cristobal =

American football coach and former player (born 1970)

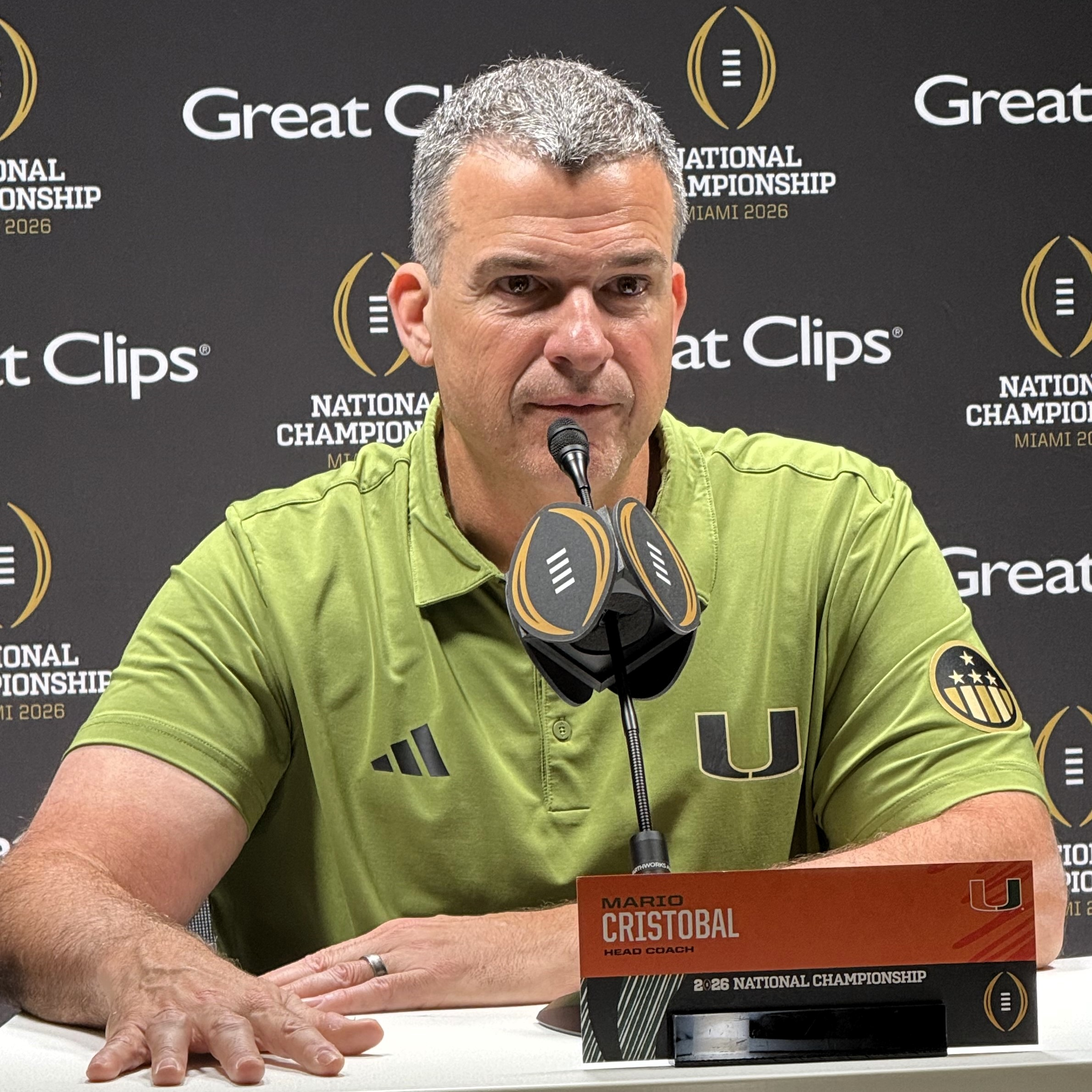
- Cristobal in 2026

Current position
- Title: Head coach
- Team: Miami (FL)
- Conference: ACC
- Record: 45–20
- Annual salary: $8 million

Biographical details
- Born: September 24, 1970 (age 56); Miami, Florida, U.S.

Playing career
- 1989–1992: Miami (FL)
- 1995–1996: Amsterdam Admirals
- Position: Offensive tackle

Coaching career (HC unless noted)
- 1998–2000: Miami (FL) (GA)
- 2001–2002: Rutgers (OT/TE)
- 2003: Rutgers (OL)
- 2004–2005: Miami (FL) (TE)
- 2006: Miami (FL) (OL)
- 2007–2012: FIU
- 2013–2016: Alabama (AHC/OL/RC)
- 2017: Oregon (co-OC/OL)
- 2018–2021: Oregon
- 2022–present: Miami (FL)

Head coaching record
- Overall: 107–80
- Bowls: 6–5
- Tournaments: 3–1 (CFP)

Accomplishments and honors

Championships
- As coach: Sun Belt (2010); 2× Pac-12 (2019–2020); 2× Pac-12 North Division (2019–2020); As player: 2× National (1989, 1991)

Awards
- Sun Belt Coach of the Year (2010); AP Pac-12 Coach of the Year (2019); 247Sports National Recruiter of the Year (2015)

Mario Manuel Cristobal (born September 24, 1970) is an American college football coach who is the head football coach for the University of Miami. He previously served as the head football coach at Florida International University (FIU) from 2007 to 2012 and the University of Oregon from 2017 to 2021. He was an all-conference offensive tackle on the Miami Hurricanes football team that won national championships in 1989 and 1991.

== Early life and education ==
Cristobal was born in Miami on September 24, 1970. He played high school football at Christopher Columbus High School in the Miami-Dade County community of Westchester. Cristobal started on the offensive line alongside Alex Mirabal, who went on to become his offensive line coach at Miami, and Fernando Mendoza IV, whose son Fernando V won the 2025 Heisman Trophy as quarterback at Indiana and led the Hoosiers to a win over Cristobal's Miami team in the 2026 College Football Playoff National Championship.

Cristobal then went to play for the University of Miami, where he was a four-year letterman between 1989 and 1992. Cristobal played under Hall of Fame coach Dennis Erickson during the rise of the University of Miami as one of the nation's most elite college football programs. During his four seasons at the University of Miami, he was a member of two national championship-winning teams (1989 and 1991). In 1992, Cristobal earned First-team All-Big East Conference as an offensive tackle.

In 1993, he graduated from the University of Miami with a Bachelor of Business Administration degree from the University of Miami School of Business, and later earned a master's degree there in 2001. Cristobal is one of several University of Miami players from the late 1980s who appears in the documentary The U, which premiered December 12, 2009, on ESPN and chronicles the program's rapid ascent and national championships and the era's associated scandals that proved costly to it. The documentary drew 2.3 million viewers, making it then the most watched documentary in ESPN history.

=== Professional career ===
Following his collegiate career at the University of Miami, Cristobal signed a free agent contract with the Denver Broncos in 1994. He then played for the Amsterdam Admirals of NFL Europe in 1995 and 1996.

== Coaching career ==
Cristobal's coaching career began at the University of Miami, where he served as a graduate assistant under head football coach Butch Davis from 1998 to 2000. From 2001 to 2003, Cristobal was the tight ends and offensive line coach at Rutgers University under Greg Schiano. He returned to Miami to serve as tight ends coach and offensive line coach under Larry Coker for three seasons from 2004 to 2006.

=== FIU ===
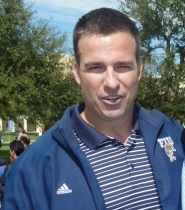
Cristobal in 2011.

On December 19, 2006, Cristobal was named the second head coach in FIU's history. He also was the first Cuban-American head coach in Division I-A. Cristobal inherited a team with a winless record the previous season. He implemented a spread offense, and stated that he expected FIU to achieve success "faster than what we did at Rutgers", a process which "took five years".

FIU struggled for most of his first season as head coach, losing their first 11 games. However, on December 1, the Golden Panthers finally broke a Football Bowl Subdivision-leading 23-game losing skid with a 38–19 victory over North Texas.

His second season showed considerable signs of improvement. After three straight non-conference losses to Kansas, Iowa, and USF, the Golden Panthers under Cristobal pulled together an upset win against MAC opponent Toledo. The team used this momentum to build a three-game winning streak, defeating Sun Belt Conference opponents North Texas and MTSU before finishing with a 5–7 record. The team was two wins away from a bowl game before falling out of contention in the 2008 Shula Bowl against in-state rivals FAU in a 57–50 overtime loss, before finishing its season with a home victory over Western Kentucky.

The third season under Cristobal came with high expectations after winning five games the previous year. The team took a step back going 3–9 overall, with wins coming against North Texas, Western Kentucky, and Louisiana-Lafayette. During the offseason recruiting period, Cristobal was able to secure FIU's first ESPN 150 player, Willis Wright, from nearby Miami Springs High, the same school that produced T. Y. Hilton.

After being predicted to finish sixth in the conference in the preseason by the Sun Belt Writers Association, Cristobal led his young Panthers team to their first Sun Belt Conference championship after four years at the helm. FIU, who had never had a winning season prior to the 2010 campaign, saw themselves atop the conference tied with Troy University who shared a similar 6–2 conference record. FIU did win their head-to-head matchup with Troy, 52–35. At the conclusion of the season FIU was selected to participate in their first bowl game, the Little Caesars Pizza Bowl. They won with a field goal in the closing seconds against Toledo, 34–32, after Toledo went for a two-point conversion to take the lead, 32–31. That win gave them a 7–6 record, their first ever winning record.

Cristobal carries a reputation of being an excellent recruiter, setting up for his third season at FIU by putting together an impressive recruiting class of 23 student athletes, at least 20 of them from Florida. He was also named the fittest coach currently in the FBS according to an ESPN blog to which he confirmed on The Dan Le Batard Show on May 29, 2009. As of the 2009 season, Cristobal has retired the "shirt-and-tie" look and has opted to wear traditional collared shirts during games. Novem On December 5, 2012, Cristobal was fired of his position as head coach of the FIU football program after going 3–9. FIU Athletic Director Pete Garcia explained his reasoning for firing Cristobal as "He's done a very good job for this program, but we've gone backwards over the last year and a half. Over the last 22 games, we've gone 8–14." The decision by Garcia was heavily criticized as rash.

=== Alabama ===
After his dismissal as head coach at FIU, Cristobal was hired by Miami to serve as associate head coach and tight ends coach on January 10, 2013. Six weeks later, he was hired by Nick Saban to become Alabama's assistant head coach, offensive line coach, and recruiting coordinator.

Cristobal was an elite recruiter at Alabama, finishing No. 1 in the national 247Sports.com composite rankings in each of his four seasons. He was named the National Recruiter of the Year by 247Sports in the 2015 cycle and in 2016 he was ranked as the nation's No. 2 recruiter in the country by 247Sports.

Cristobal's Alabama offensive line was awarded as the nation's best in 2015, winning the inaugural Joe Moore Award given to the toughest, most physical line in the nation. His offensive line ranked in the top 25 nationally in (fewest) sacks allowed in each of his first two seasons. Alabama's offensive lines produced standout players and NFL draft picks under Cristobal, including first-team All-American and 2015 first-round draft pick Ryan Kelly and 2014 freshman All-American Cam Robinson, who went on to win the Outland Trophy in Cristobal's final year with Alabama.

=== Oregon ===
In January 2017, Mario Cristobal joined Willie Taggart's staff at Oregon as offensive line coach, with additional duties as co-offensive coordinator (shared with quarterbacks coach Marcus Arroyo) and run game coordinator (along with running backs coach Donte Pimpleton). On December 5, 2017, he was given the title of interim head coach upon Willie Taggart's departure to Florida State; then, three days later, on Friday, December 8, 2017, Cristobal was officially announced as permanent head coach of the Ducks.

After Taggart's abrupt departure, Cristobal fielded a team in 2018 that improved to 9-4 and won the Redbox Bowl (formerly the San Francisco Bowl) against Michigan State.

In 2019, Cristobal was voted Pac-12 Coach of the Year by the Associated Press after going 11-2 during the regular season, winning the North division, beating Utah in the Conference Championship, and earning a trip to the Rose Bowl. That year, Cristobal and offensive line coach Alex Mirabal coached All-American Penei Sewell, who went on to win the Outland Trophy for best interior linemen in the country. The Oregon offensive line unit was a finalist for the 2019 Joe Moore Award for best overall group in the country. Oregon finished the post season with a Rose Bowl victory over the Wisconsin Badgers.

In 2020, Cristobal again led Oregon to a Pac-12 Championship, posting a 4–2 record against a conference-only schedule due to the COVID-19 pandemic. Oregon finished the season with a loss in the Fiesta Bowl to Iowa State.

In 2021, Cristobal took Oregon to a 10–2 regular season record before a surprise departure of the program prior to the season-ending Alamo Bowl loss to Oklahoma.

=== Miami ===
On December 6, 2021, Cristobal was named head coach of the University of Miami Hurricanes football team, replacing Manny Diaz. Cristobal signed a 10-year, $80 million contract with the Hurricanes.

During his second year at Miami, Cristobal received significant criticism in October 2023 for what was widely deemed a costly clock management mistake during a home game against the Georgia Tech Yellow Jackets at Hard Rock Stadium. Up three points with under forty seconds left, and Georgia Tech out of timeouts, the Hurricanes' offense ran the ball instead of kneeling in victory formation, causing a turnover that the Yellow Jackets recovered, leading to Georgia Tech winning the game 23–20.

In 2024, Cristobal’s third year as Miami’s head coach, he led the Hurricanes to their first 10-win season since 2017. He also secured Miami’s fourth Florida Cup—an unofficial title awarded to the Florida-based FBS team that defeats its two in-state rivals in the same season—marking the Hurricanes’ first such sweep since 2004. Additionally, the Hurricanes had their first No. 1 overall pick NFL Draft pick since Russell Maryland in 1991, and their first quarterback selected first overall since Vinny Testaverde in 1987, with Cam Ward—taken in the 2025 NFL draft—becoming the third player in program history to be selected No. 1 overall.

In 2025, during Cristobal’s fourth season as head coach, Miami opened the season with a victory over No. 6 Notre Dame. The Hurricanes also defeated Bethune-Cookman, No. 18 USF (which had beaten Florida the previous week), Florida, and No. 18 Florida State. These wins marked Miami’s first sweep of Notre Dame, Florida, and Florida State in a single season since 1987, and secured the program’s fifth Florida Cup title—and second consecutive one. Miami started the year 4–0 against in-state opponents, extending its streak to 8–0 over the past two seasons (the Hurricanes also went 4–0 against in-state rivals in 2024).

After rising to No. 2 in the AP Poll following a 5–0 start, Miami suffered its first loss of the season against 4–1 Louisville at home, dropping the Hurricanes to No. 9. The team rebounded with a 42–7 victory over Stanford, but later fell 26–20 in overtime to 5–3 SMU, led by former Miami offensive coordinator Rhett Lashlee (who served under Manny Diaz from 2020 to 2021 before departing prior to Cristobal’s arrival). The loss dropped Miami to No. 18 in the first College Football Playoff rankings of 2025.

Miami responded with a four-game winning streak to close the regular season, defeating Syracuse, NC State, and Virginia Tech, and finishing with a 38–7 road win over No. 22 Pittsburgh—its average margin of victory over the final four games exceeding 27 points. The Hurricanes climbed back to No. 12 in the final regular-season CFP rankings and concluded the 2025 regular season 10–2 (6–2 in ACC play), narrowly missing a berth in the ACC Championship Game behind Virginia and Duke.

The campaign kept Miami in contention for a College Football Playoff spot entering postseason play and marked the program’s first back-to-back 10-win seasons since 2002–03 under Cristobal.

Following their 10–2 finish, Miami was selected as the No. 10 seed for the 2025 College Football Playoff, marking the Hurricanes’ first-ever playoff appearance and the first time any Florida program has reached the playoff since 2014.

As the No. 10 seed in the College Football Playoff, Miami was set to face No. 7 Texas A&M at Kyle Field. The Aggies came in 11-1 having only lost 1 game to Texas. The Hurricanes defeated the Aggies 10–3 in a defensive battle marked by extreme weather conditions, with winds exceeding 30 mph significantly impacting offensive play for both teams Miami sealed the victory when true freshman Bryce Fitzgerald intercepted a pass from A&M QB Marcel Reed in the end zone with 24 seconds remaining—his second interception of the game. The win marked Miami’s first College Football Playoff victory in program history and made the Hurricanes the first Florida-based team to win a College Football Playoff game.

With the victory, Miami advanced to the next round of the College Football Playoff to face No. 2 Ohio State—the defending national champions—in the Cotton Bowl. The matchup drew significant national attention due to the programs’ history, most notably the 2003 Fiesta Bowl, in which Ohio State defeated Miami (the then defending national champion) in the BCS National Championship Game. Although the two teams had met in the years since that contest, the Cotton Bowl marked their first postseason meeting since 2003.

On New Year’s Eve, Miami defeated Ohio State 24–14 in the Cotton Bowl, eliminating the defending national champions. Miami’s defense proved decisive, recording five sacks of Ohio State quarterback Julian Sayin and forcing multiple turnovers, including a pick-six by defensive back Keionte Scott.

On January 8, 2026, the Hurricanes played Ole Miss in the Fiesta Bowl for the College Football Playoff Semifinals. Facing an 0-4 all-time record in the Fiesta Bowl, Miami defeated Ole Miss 31–27 in a thrilling game that had 4 lead changes in the final 8 minutes.

Miami lost to the undefeated Indiana Hoosiers 27–21 in the College Football National Championship game in Miami’s first appearance since the 2003 Fiesta Bowl.

== Recruiting ==
Cristobal is known for his accomplishments and skills as recruiter of elite collegiate football prospects. During his four seasons at Alabama, the Crimson Tide finished with the top-ranked recruiting class in each year of Cristobal's involvement with the program. Cristobal was a key part of the Tide's recruiting dominance as the primary recruiter for multiple 5-star recruits and future first round NFL draft picks. In 2015. Cristobal was named the top recruiter in the nation by 247Sports, ESPN, Rivals and Scout.

In 2017, Cristobal joined Willie Taggart's staff at Oregon, where he helped the Ducks sign the 13th ranked recruiting class. After Taggart left Oregon for a head coaching job at Florida State, Cristobal replaced him as head coach of Oregon. In his three years as head coach, Oregon signed the 8th, 12th and 6th ranked recruiting classes, which included #1 overall recruit and future #5 overall draft pick Kayvon Thibodeaux.

As head coach at the University of Miami, he was credited with a successful recruiting season that ranked as high as 5th nationally in independent assessment of the year's recruitment of high school football prospects.

== Personal life ==
Cristobal and his wife, Jessica, were married in June 2006 and have two sons, Mario Mateo and Rocco.

After his football playing career ended, Cristobal went through a two-year application process to become a U.S. Secret Service agent and was offered a job in 1998. Then a first-year graduate assistant at the University of Miami, Cristobal said his goodbyes to fellow Hurricanes players but then abruptly changed his mind the following morning and chose instead to remain with collegiate football coaching.

Cristobal is a second-generation Cuban-American.

== Head coaching record ==
Year	Team	Overall	Conference	Standing	Bowl/playoffs	Coaches^{#}	AP^{°}
FIU Golden Panthers / Panthers (Sun Belt Conference) (2007–2012)
2007	FIU	1–11	1–6	7th			
2008	FIU	5–7	3–4	T–5th			
2009	FIU	3–9	3–5	6th			
2010	FIU	7–6	6–2	T–1st	W Little Caesars Pizza		
2011	FIU	8–5	5–3	4th	L Beef 'O' Brady's		
2012	FIU	3–9	2–6	T–8th			
FIU:		27–47	20–26				
Oregon Ducks (Pac-12 Conference) (2017–2021)
2017	Oregon	0–1	0–0	4th (North)	L Las Vegas		
2018	Oregon	9–4	5–4	4th (North)	W Redbox		
2019	Oregon	12–2	8–1	1st (North)	W Rose^{†}	5	5
2020	Oregon	4–3	3–2	2nd (North)	L Fiesta^{†}		
2021	Oregon	10–3	7–2	1st (North)	Alamo (Note: Cristobal departed for Miami prior to the bowl game.)	21	22
Oregon:		35–13	23–9				
Miami Hurricanes (Atlantic Coast Conference) (2022–present)
2022	Miami	5–7	3–5	5th (Coastal)			
2023	Miami	7–6	3–5	T–9th	L Pinstripe		
2024	Miami	10–3	6–2	3rd	L Pop-Tarts	18	18
2025	Miami	13–3	6–2	T–2nd	W CFP First Round^{†}, W Cotton^{†}, W Fiesta^{†}, L CFP NCG^{†}	2	2
2026	Miami	10–1	8–0				
Miami:		45–20	26–14				
Total:		107–80					
National championship Conference title Conference division title or championship game berth
^{†}Indicates CFP / New Years' Six bowl.
