= T. Y. Hilton =

American football player (born 1989)

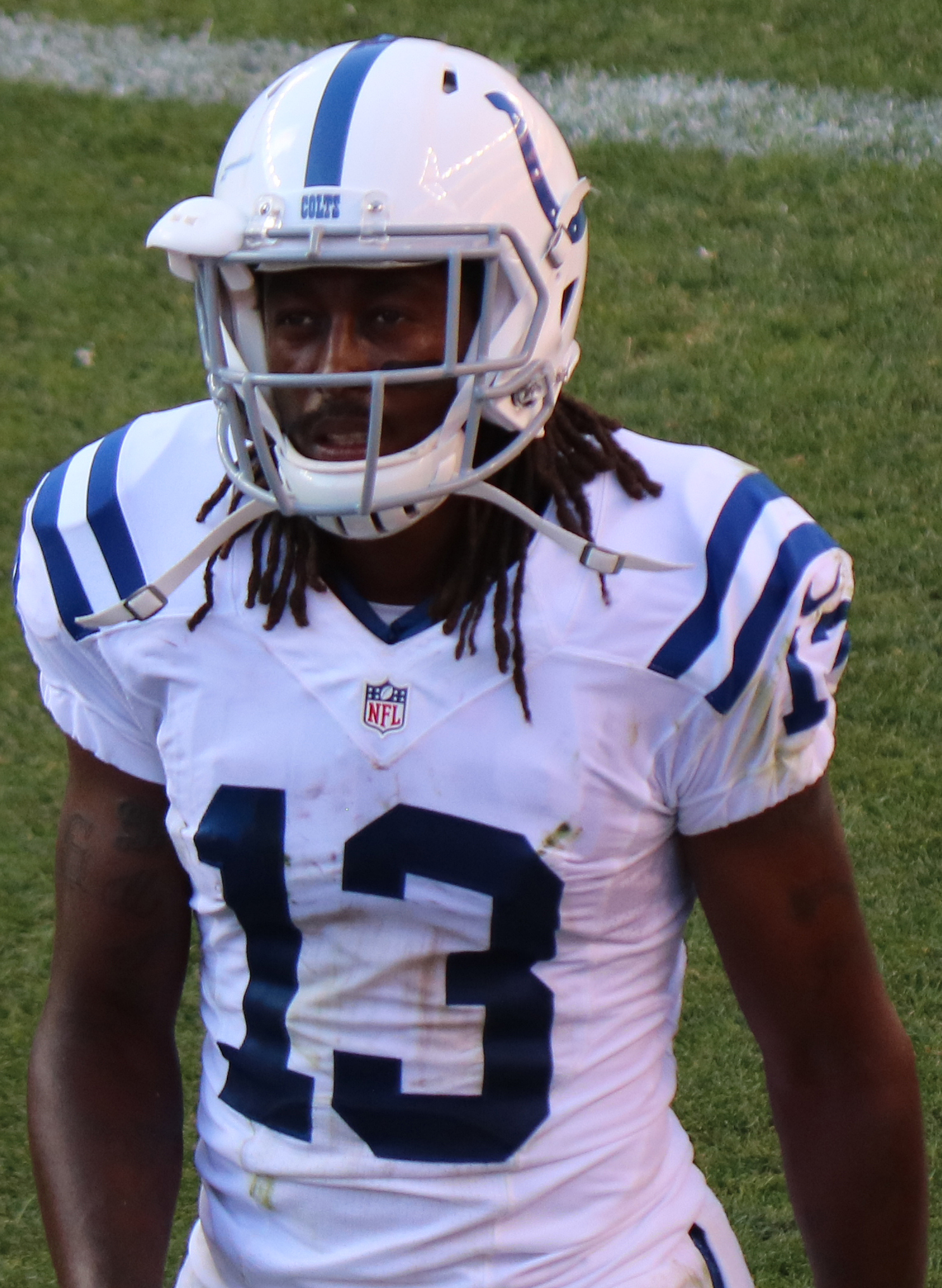
- Hilton with the Indianapolis Colts in 2016

No. 13, 16
- Position: Wide receiver

Personal information
- Born: November 14, 1989 (age 37); Miami, Florida, U.S.
- Listed height: 5 ft 10 in (1.78 m)
- Listed weight: 183 lb (83 kg)

Career information
- High school: Miami Springs (Miami Springs, Florida)
- College: FIU (2008–2011)
- NFL draft: 2012: 3rd round, 92nd overall pick

Career history
- Indianapolis Colts (2012–2021); Dallas Cowboys (2022)

Awards and highlights
- 4× Pro Bowl (2014–2017); NFL receiving yards leader (2016); PFWA NFL All-Rookie Team (2012); Sun Belt Player of the Year (2010); Sun Belt Freshman of the Year (2008); 4× First-team All-Sun Belt (2008−2011)

Career NFL statistics
- Receptions: 638
- Receiving yards: 9,812
- Receiving touchdowns: 53
- Return yards: 605
- Return touchdowns: 1
- Stats at Pro Football Reference

Eugene Marquis "T. Y." Hilton (born November 14, 1989) is an American former professional football player who was a wide receiver in the National Football League (NFL). He played college football for the FIU Panthers and was selected by the Indianapolis Colts in the third round of the 2012 NFL draft. Hilton has also played for the Dallas Cowboys.

After having 861 receiving yards his rookie season, Hilton took over the number one receiver role on the team from veteran Reggie Wayne. Due to chemistry with his fellow 2012 draftee Andrew Luck, Hilton caught over 1,000 yards in four straight seasons, including leading the league in the category in 2016. Hilton made four Pro Bowls over his career.

== Early life ==
Hilton was born to Tyrone and Cora Hilton. He attended Miami Springs High School and was a two-sport star in basketball and football for the Golden Hawks. He was selected by the Miami Herald as a First Team All-Dade selection in football in his senior year, while also selected as a First Team All-Dade in basketball both his junior and senior years. He averaged 18.7 yards per catch as a senior, with 785 receiving yards accumulated in the season to go with 16 touchdowns. In addition, he played on special teams and was successful as a kick returner, returning four kicks for touchdowns in 10 games.

== College career ==
Hilton committed to Florida International University (FIU) on February 6, 2008. He was scouted by the University of Mississippi, West Virginia University, the University of Florida and FIU. He made the choice to go to FIU over West Virginia the night before National Signing Day, when his son chose FIU eight times in a row when he put both an FIU and West Virginia hat in front of him.

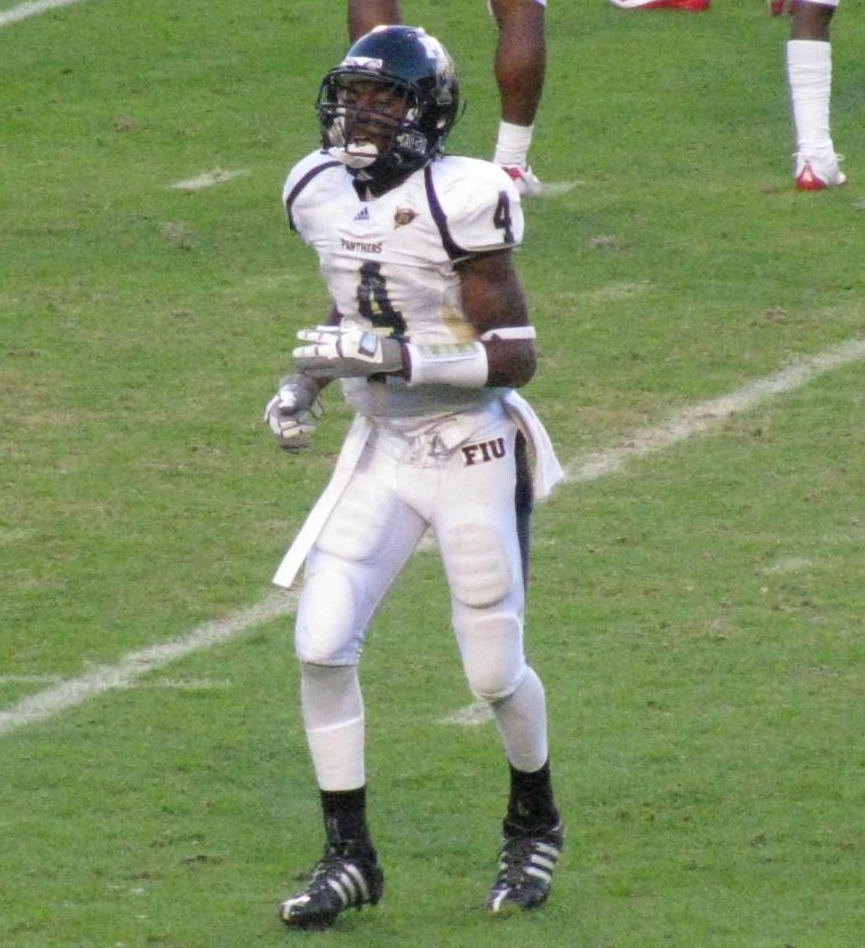
Hilton at the 2008 Shula Bowl.

=== 2008 season ===
Hilton was a starter under head coach Mario Cristobal in every year of his enrollment at FIU. In 2008, he returned a punt for a touchdown in his collegiate debut against Kansas on his first touch of the game. To start the month of October, Hilton broke out with three receptions for 145 yards and two touchdowns against North Texas. Later that year, he recorded a 90-yard kickoff return for a touchdown against Louisiana–Lafayette. In the following game against Arkansas State, he had six receptions for 199 receiving yards and threw a 38-yard touchdown pass to Junior Mertile late in the game after he fumbled the hand off in a reverse play. This play became known in FIU as "The Hilton Heave". He was responsible for 12 touchdowns in his freshman year, scoring them all in five different ways, the first player in the program to do so (seven touchdown receptions, two rushing touchdowns, one passing touchdown, one punt return, and one kickoff return). He also set the FIU single season record for total receiving yards (41 receptions for 1,013 yards), average yards per reception (24.7 yards per reception), and all-purpose yardage (2,162). He finished his freshman season ranked third in the nation in all-purpose yardage per game, with an average of 180.25 yards per contest and was consequently named Sun Belt Freshman Player of the Year.

=== 2009 season ===
Foreshadowing the start of FIU's 2009 campaign against Alabama, Crimson Tide head coach Nick Saban referred to Hilton as "a better offensive player than anybody [from Virginia Tech] that we played against last week". In 2009, Hilton's first touch of the season was a 96-yard kickoff return against Alabama. He paced the team with 57 catches for 632 yards and five touchdowns, as well as returning 22 kickoffs for 633 yards, despite struggling with an injured knee picked up in the fifth game of the season against the Western Kentucky Hilltoppers. He finished his sophomore season with 1,301 all-purpose yards.

=== 2010 season ===
In 2010, Hilton got off to a slow start, scoring no touchdowns in the first four games of the season, before returning home to play Western Kentucky and scoring his first touchdown of the season, a rushing touchdown. After a mid-season loss to the FAU Owls, Hilton came back strong the next game against the Louisiana-Monroe Warhawks, scoring four separate touchdowns, the first coming on a 95-yard kick return while the others were two passes from quarterback Wesley Carroll and the last a rushing touchdown. Later in the season against Troy, Hilton put up 158 yards rushing in six carries with two rushing touchdowns on his way to helping set a school record of 448 total rushing yards in a game.

In FIU's first bowl game appearance in the 2010 Little Caesars Pizza Bowl, Hilton returned a kickoff for a touchdown in the second half of the game against the Toledo Rockets. He was also instrumental in a late hook and lateral play on a 4th-and-17 situation, helping his team get the first down and keeping them alive to eventually set up the winning field goal. He was named the Little Caesars Pizza Bowl MVP for his efforts in helping his team beat Toledo by a score of 34–32. At the end of his junior season, Hilton was honored as Sun Belt Player of the Year, as well as being named to the All-Sun Belt Conference First Team at the wide receiver and return specialist positions. He finished his junior season with 2,089 all-purpose yards, 848 of them on receptions over 59 catches and 282 rushing yards over 30 carries, a personal best.

=== 2011 season ===
In 2011, Hilton got off to a hot start in his senior season, putting up a school record 283 all-purpose yards in FIU's rout of the North Texas Mean Green. A week later, Hilton was instrumental in FIU's 24–17 upset of the Louisville Cardinals, with 74 and 83 yard catches for touchdowns. He finished that game with seven receptions for 201 yards, breaking his school and personal single game receiving records. On October 8 against Akron, he had 12 receptions for 144 yards in the 27–17 victory. On November 12, he had a 97-yard punt return for a touchdown against FAU. He finished the 2011 season with 72 receptions for 1,038 receiving yards and seven receiving touchdowns to go along with one punt return touchdown.

== Professional career ==
Pre-draft measurables
Height	Weight	Arm length	Hand span	40-yard dash	10-yard split	20-yard split	20-yard shuttle	Three-cone drill	Vertical jump	Broad jump	Bench press
5 ft 9 1/2 in (1.77 m)	183 lb (83 kg)	32 in (0.81 m)	8 1/2 in (0.22 m)	4.34 s	1.53 s	2.51 s	4.36 s	7.03 s	35.5 in (0.90 m)	9 ft 11 in (3.02 m)	7 reps
All values from NFL Combine/Pro Day

=== Indianapolis Colts ===
==== 2012 season ====
On April 27, 2012, Hilton was selected in the third round with the 92nd overall pick of the 2012 NFL draft by the Indianapolis Colts. He was the 13th wide receiver taken in the draft. In late May 2012, Hilton signed a contract with Indianapolis worth $2.6 million over four years. Hilton was utilized during his rookie season as a punt/kick returner and as a slot receiver for fellow rookie, quarterback Andrew Luck. During a Week 12 game against the Buffalo Bills, Hilton returned a punt for 75 yards and later caught an eight-yard touchdown pass. The two scores proved to be the difference in a 20–13 victory.

Hilton finished his rookie year with four games reaching the 100-yard mark. He totaled 50 catches for 861 yards and led the team in touchdown catches with seven. He was named to the PFWA All-Rookie Team. He made his playoff debut in the Wild Card Round against the Baltimore Ravens. He had eight receptions for 66 yards in the 24–9 loss.

==== 2013 season ====
Hilton began the 2013 season as the third wide receiver on the depth chart, behind veterans Reggie Wayne and Darrius Heyward-Bey.

Hilton had a career-high day for yardage against the Seattle Seahawks top-ranked pass defense in a Week 5 game. He had five catches for 140 yards and two key touchdown receptions, including a then career-long 73-yard touchdown. Hilton's scores helped the Colts win the game over the eventual Super Bowl XLVIII champions by a score of 34–28.

Due to the season-ending ACL tear by Reggie Wayne in Week 7 and low production from Darrius Heyward-Bey, Hilton became the number one receiving target for the team. In the Week 9 game against the Houston Texans that immediately followed Wayne's injury, Hilton's 121 receiving yards and three touchdowns contributed to a fourth-quarter comeback. In Week 17, with a pass from Andrew Luck, Hilton recorded his first career 1,000 yard season, and broke his career-high for receiving yards in a game with 155.

In the Colts 45–44 comeback Wild Card Round victory over the Kansas City Chiefs, Hilton recorded 13 receptions for 224 yards (both playoff-franchise records) and two touchdowns. His 224 yards are the third-most by a receiver in a playoff game in NFL history, trailing Anthony Carter's 227-yard game for the Minnesota Vikings in 1988 and Eric Moulds's 240-yard game for the Buffalo Bills in 1999. In the Divisional Round, he had four receptions for 103 yards in the 43–22 loss to the New England Patriots.

==== 2014 season ====
In a Week 6 matchup against the Houston Texans, Hilton established a new career-high in receiving yards, recording nine receptions for 223 yards and a touchdown. He finished one yard short of Raymond Berry's franchise-record, set in 1957. In Week 12, Hilton surpassed 1,000 receiving yards for the second consecutive season. Hilton broke his personal receiving yards record in Week 14 against the Cleveland Browns. He caught 10 passes for 150 yards and two touchdowns, bringing his season total yardage to 1,295. Hilton also tied his personal best in touchdown receptions with seven on the season. He was named to his first-career Pro Bowl on December 23. Hilton would miss Week 16 with a hamstring injury, and did not record a catch in Week 17, finishing the season with a career-high 1,345 yards on 82 receptions. He earned his first Pro Bowl nomination for his 2014 season. He was ranked 35th by his fellow players on the NFL Top 100 Players of 2015.

The Colts made the postseason and faced off against the Cincinnati Bengals in the Wild Card Round. In the 26–10 victory, Hilton had six receptions for 103 receiving yards. In the Divisional Round, Hilton had four receptions for 72 receiving yards in the 24–13 victory over the Denver Broncos. In the AFC Championship, Hilton had one reception for 36 yards in the 45–7 loss to the New England Patriots.

==== 2015 season ====
On August 13, 2015, Hilton signed a five-year, $65 million extension with the Colts, with $39 million guaranteed. On the season, he had two games going over the 100-yard mark. He played in all 16 games in the 2015 season, recording 69 receptions for 1,124 yards and five touchdowns. On January 25, 2016, Hilton was named to his second-consecutive Pro Bowl.

==== 2016 season ====
In the Colts' Week 3 game against the San Diego Chargers, Hilton had eight receptions for 174 yards, including a game winning 63-yard touchdown reception. In Week 5 against the Chicago Bears, Hilton had 10 receptions for 171 yards and a touchdown to help the Colts win 29–23. On December 20, he was named to his third consecutive Pro Bowl. Hilton finished the 2016 season with six touchdowns. He led the NFL in receiving yards for the 2016 season with 1,448. He joined Reggie Wayne, Marvin Harrison, Roger Carr, and Raymond Berry as the only Colts in team history to lead the NFL in receiving yards. He earned a Pro Bowl nomination for the third consecutive season. He was ranked 61st by his fellow players on the NFL Top 100 Players of 2017.

==== 2017 season ====
In Week 3 against the Cleveland Browns, Hilton caught seven passes for 153 yards and a 61-yard touchdown to help the Colts win 31–28. In Week 5 against the San Francisco 49ers, Hilton caught seven passes for 177 yards to help the Colts win 26–23 in overtime. During Week 9 against the Houston Texans, Hilton posted an NFL-leading 175 receiving yards and two touchdowns as the Colts won 20–14, earning him AFC Offensive Player of the Week. He finished the season with 57 receptions for 966 yards and four touchdowns. He was named to his fourth straight Pro Bowl on January 10, 2018, as an injury replacement.

==== 2018 season ====
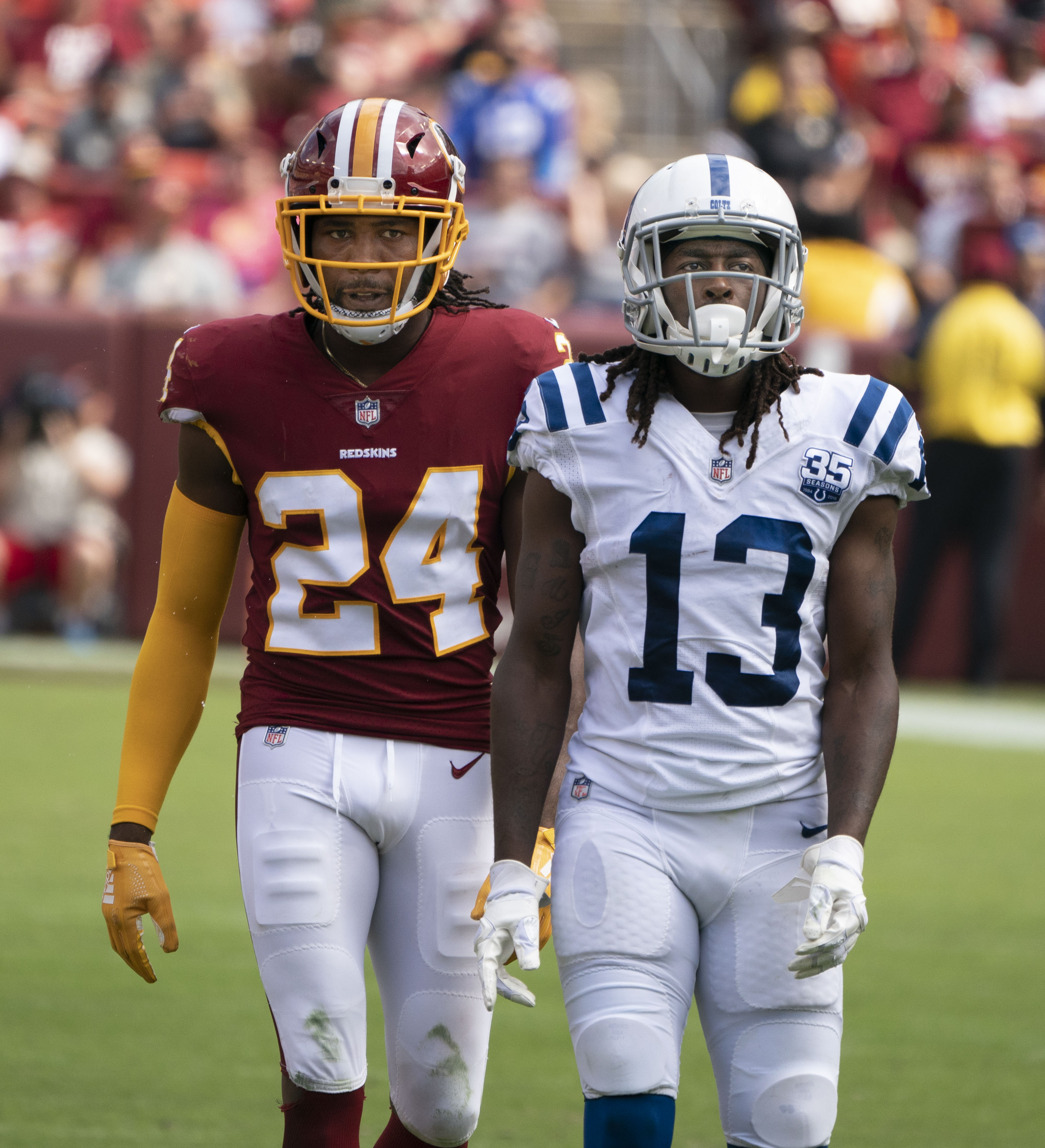
Hilton and Josh Norman in a game against the Washington Redskins in 2018

In Week 4 against the Houston Texans, Hilton caught four passes for 115 yards in a 37–34 overtime loss. On November 18, against the Tennessee Titans, he had nine receptions for 155 yards and two touchdowns. During a Texans rematch in Week 14, Hilton finished with 199 receiving yards as the Colts won 24–21. Overall, he finished the 2018 season with 76 receptions for 1,270 yards and six touchdowns. Hilton returned to the playoffs for the first time since the 2014 season as the Colts earned the #6-seed in the AFC. In the Wild Card Round victory over the Houston Texans, he had five receptions for 85 yards. In the Divisional Round loss to the Kansas City Chiefs, he had four receptions for 60 yards and a touchdown. He was ranked 70th by his fellow players on the NFL Top 100 Players of 2019.

==== 2019 season ====
Before the Colts and Hilton opened up the 2019 season, Andrew Luck unexpectedly retired. During the season-opener against the Los Angeles Chargers, Hilton caught eight passes for 87 yards and two touchdowns from Jacoby Brissett in the 24–30 overtime loss. Overall, Hilton appeared in ten games, missing six due to injuries, and finished the 2019 season with 45 receptions for 501 receiving yards and five receiving touchdowns.

==== 2020 season ====
Hilton was placed on the active/non-football injury list at the start of training camp on August 2, 2020. He was added back to the active roster on August 12.

Hilton started the 2020 season with a new quarterback in veteran Philip Rivers. In Week 12 against the Tennessee Titans, Hilton recorded four catches for 81 yards, including his first touchdown reception of the season, during the 45–26 loss. In Week 13 against the Houston Texans, Hilton recorded eight catches for 110 yards and a touchdown during the 26–20 win. This was Hilton’s first 100-yard receiving game of the season. In Week 14, against the Las Vegas Raiders, he had five receptions for 86 receiving yards and two touchdowns in the 44–27 victory. He finished the 2020 season with 56 receptions for 762 receiving yards and five receiving touchdowns.

==== 2021 season ====
On March 31, 2021, Hilton re-signed on a one-year, $8 million contract with the Colts. He was placed on injured reserve on September 2, 2021, to start the season. He was activated on October 16, 2021. Hilton played in ten games in the 2021 season. He finished with 23 receptions for 331 receiving yards and three receiving touchdowns.

=== Dallas Cowboys ===
On December 12, 2022, after going unsigned all offseason and most of the regular season, Hilton signed with the Dallas Cowboys.

During his first game with the Cowboys against the Philadelphia Eagles on Christmas Eve on December 24, 2022, Hilton caught a 52-yard pass from Dak Prescott to allow the Cowboys to convert on 3rd-and-30, as the Cowboys won 40–34. He appeared in three games for the Cowboys in the 2022 season, and two games for them in that season's playoffs.

On March 18, 2026, after being a free agent for three seasons, Hilton officially announced his retirement from the NFL.

== Career statistics ==
Legend
	Led the league
**Bold**	Career high

=== NFL ===
==== Regular season ====
Year	Team	Games		Receiving					Rushing					Fumbles	
Year	Team	GP	GS	Rec	Yds	Avg	Lng	TD	Att	Yds	Avg	Lng	TD	Fum	Lost
2012	IND	15	1	50	861	17.2	70	**7**	**5**	**29**	5.8	**19**	0	1	0
2013	IND	16	10	82	1,083	13.2	73T	5	2	6	3.0	3	0	1	0
2014	IND	15	15	82	1,345	16.4	73T	**7**	2	20	**10.0**	15	0	**3**	**1**
2015	IND	16	15	69	1,124	16.3	**87T**	5	—	—	—	—	—	1	0
2016	IND	16	16	**91**	**1,448**	15.9	63T	6	—	—	—	—	—	0	0
2017	IND	16	16	57	966	16.9	80T	4	—	—	—	—	—	2	**1**
2018	IND	14	14	76	1,270	16.7	68T	6	—	—	—	—	—	0	0
2019	IND	10	10	45	501	11.1	35	5	—	—	—	—	—	0	0
2020	IND	15	15	56	762	13.8	50	5	—	—	—	—	—	0	0
2021	IND	10	9	23	331	14.4	52	3	—	—	—	—	—	0	0
2022	DAL	3	0	7	121	**17.3**	52	0	—	—	—	—	—	0	0
Career		146	121	634	9,812	15.5	87T	53	9	55	6.1	19	0	8	2

==== Postseason ====
Year	Team	Games		Receiving					Rushing					Fumbles	
Year	Team	GP	GS	Rec	Yds	Avg	Lng	TD	Att	Yds	Avg	Lng	TD	Fum	Lost
2012	IND	1	0	8	66	8.3	25	0	—	—	—	—	—	0	0
2013	IND	2	2	**17**	**327**	**19.2**	**64T**	**2**	—	—	—	—	—	0	0
2014	IND	3	3	11	211	**19.2**	36	0	**1**	**1**	**1.0**	**1**	0	0	0
2018	IND	2	2	9	145	16.1	38	1	—	—	—	—	—	0	0
2020	IND	1	1	2	32	16.0	23	0	—	—	—	—	—	0	0
2022	DAL	2	0	3	38	12.7	15	0	—	—	—	—	—	0	0
Career		11	8	50	819	16.4	64	3	1	1	1.0	1	0	0	0

=== College ===
Season	Team	GP	Receiving				Rushing			
Season	Team	GP	Rec	Yds	Avg	TD	Att	Yds	Avg	TD
2008	FIU	12	41	1,013	**24.7**	**7**	14	43	3.1	2
2009	FIU	12	57	632	11.1	5	6	49	8.2	0
2010	FIU	13	59	848	14.4	5	**30**	**282**	**9.4**	**4**
2011	FIU	13	**72**	**1,038**	14.4	**7**	19	124	6.5	1
Career		50	229	3,531	15.4	24	69	498	7.2	7

== Career highlights ==
=== Awards and honors ===
NFL

- 4× Pro Bowl (2014–2017)
- NFL receiving yards leader (2016)
- PFWA NFL All-Rookie Team (2012)
- 3× NFL Top 100 — 35th (2015), 61st (2017), 70th (2019)

College

- Sun Belt Player of the Year (2010)
- Sun Belt Freshman of the Year (2008)
- 4× First-team All-Sun Belt (2008−2011)

=== School records ===
Hilton set several school records at FIU:

- Career receptions (229)
- Career receiving yards (3,531)
- Career receiving touchdowns (24)
- Single-season receptions (72 in 2011)
- Single-season receiving yards (1,038 in 2011)
- Single-game receptions (12 against Akron in 2011)
- Single-game receiving yards (201 against Louisville in 2011)

== Personal life ==
Hilton and his wife are parents to a daughter. In addition, Hilton has 2 sons, Eugene Hilton Jr, a wide receiver at Wisconsin, and Ty Hilton. Hilton, whose given name is Eugene, explained how he became known as T. Y.: "My daddy’s name is Tyrone, so ever since I was little, everyone has just used the first two letters of that."
