= Alex Mirabal =

American football coach (born 1970)

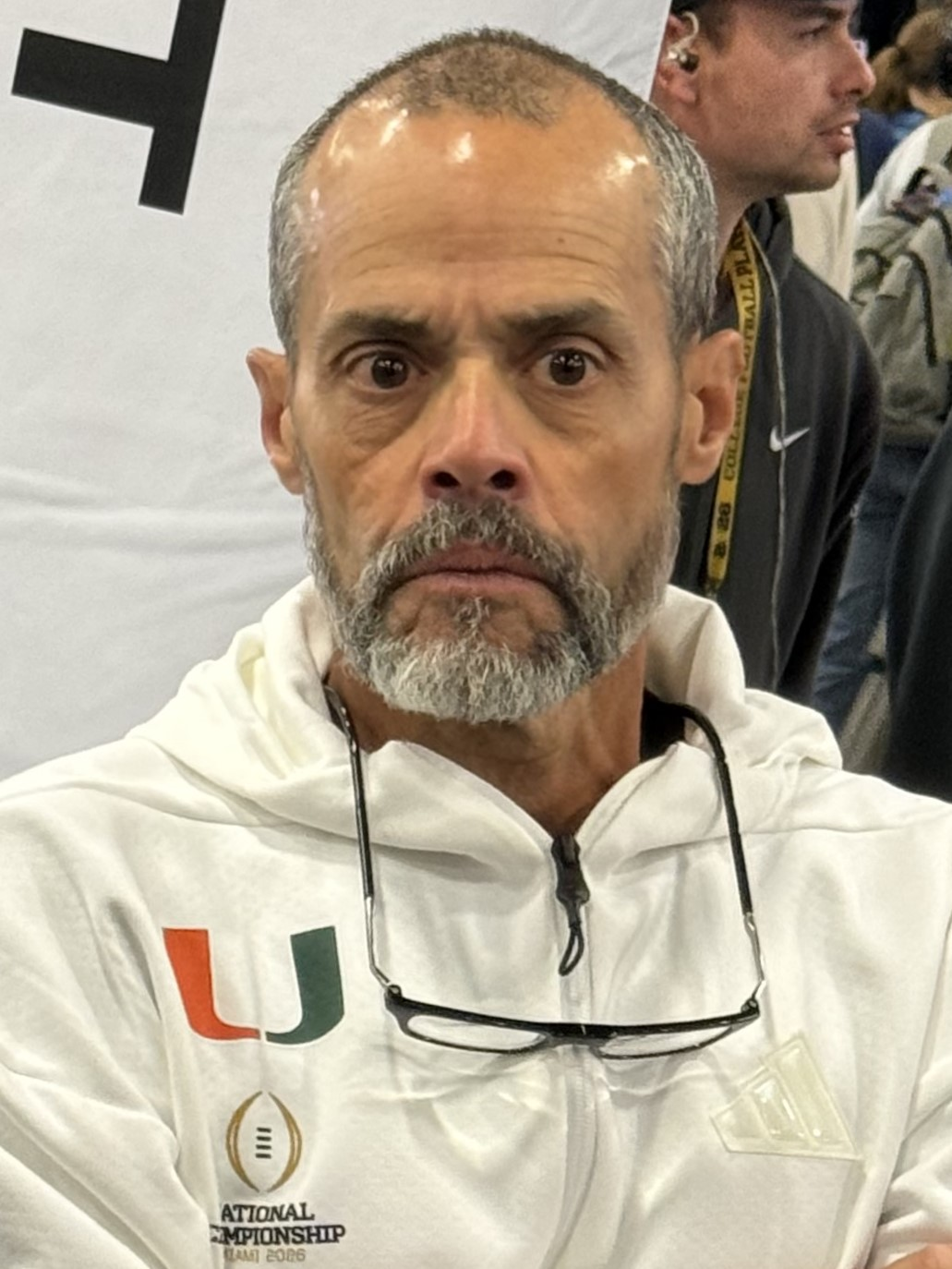
- Mirabal in 2026

Current position
- Title: Assistant HC/Offensive line coach
- Team: Miami
- Conference: ACC

Biographical details
- Born: Miami, Florida, U.S.

Coaching career (HC unless noted)
- 1993–2006: Christopher Columbus High School (OL/Assistant)
- 2007–2010: FIU (AHC/TE)
- 2011–2012: FIU (AHC/OL)
- 2013–2017: Marshall (OL)
- 2018–2021: Oregon (OL)
- 2022–present: Miami (FL) (AHC/OL)

Alex Mirabal is an American football coach who currently serves as the assistant head coach and offensive line coach at the University of Miami. A Miami native, Mirabal played high school football at Christopher Columbus High School, where he was teammates with future head coach Mario Cristobal. He began his coaching career at his alma mater before moving to the collegiate ranks. Over the years, he has built a reputation as one of the nation's top offensive line coaches, mentoring elite linemen, including Penei Sewell, and contributing to multiple conference championships at Florida International University (FIU), Marshall University, and the University of Oregon.

== Early life ==
Mirabal attended Christopher Columbus High School in the Miami-Dade County community of Westchester, Florida, where he played football, starting on the offensive line alongside future coach Mario Cristobal and Fernando Mendoza IV, father of 2025 Heisman Trophy winner Fernando Mendoza (V).

== Coaching career ==
Mirabal began his coaching career at Christopher Columbus High School, where he served in various roles from 1993 to 2006, including offensive line coach and strength and conditioning coordinator. In 2007, he joined Florida International University (FIU), where he coached tight ends from 2007 to 2010 before becoming the offensive line coach from 2011 to 2012. From 2013 to 2017, Mirabal was the offensive line coach at Marshall University, helping lead the team to multiple bowl victories and a Conference USA championship. In 2018, he joined University of Oregon as the offensive line coach, where he helped develop an elite unit, including Outland Trophy winner Penei Sewell. In 2022, Mirabal followed head coach Mario Cristobal to the University of Miami, where he currently serves as the assistant head coach and offensive line coach.
