= 2011 Beef 'O' Brady's Bowl =

- 4th Beef 'O' Brady's Bowl
FIU Panthers	Marshall Thundering Herd
(8–4)	(6–6)
Sun Belt	C-USA
10	20
Head coach: Mario Cristobal	Head coach: Doc Holliday
	1	2	3	4	Total
FIU	7	3	0	0	10
Marshall	3	7	0	10	20
- Date: December 20, 2011
- Season: 2011
- Stadium: Tropicana Field
- Location: St. Petersburg, Florida
- MVP: Aaron Dobson- Marshall
- Favorite: Florida International by 4
- Referee: Hubert Owens (SEC)
- Attendance: 20,072
- Payout: US$1 million per team

United States TV coverage
- Network: ESPN
- Announcers: Mike Patrick (Play-by-Play); Danny Kanell (Analyst); Jeannine Edwards (Sidelines)
- Nielsen ratings: 1.52

The 2011 Beef 'O'Brady's Bowl, the fourth edition of the game formerly known as the St. Petersburg Bowl, was a post-season American college football bowl game, held on December 20, 2011 at Tropicana Field in St. Petersburg, Florida, and telecast at 8:00 p.m. ET on ESPN as part of the 2011–12 NCAA Bowl season. Marshall defeated Florida International, 20–10.

On December 3, 2011, Florida International University accepted an invitation to play in the bowl game, as the Big East Conference did not have enough bowl-eligible teams to send a representative to St. Petersburg. The following day, Marshall University accepted an invitation to play in the bowl game.

== Teams ==
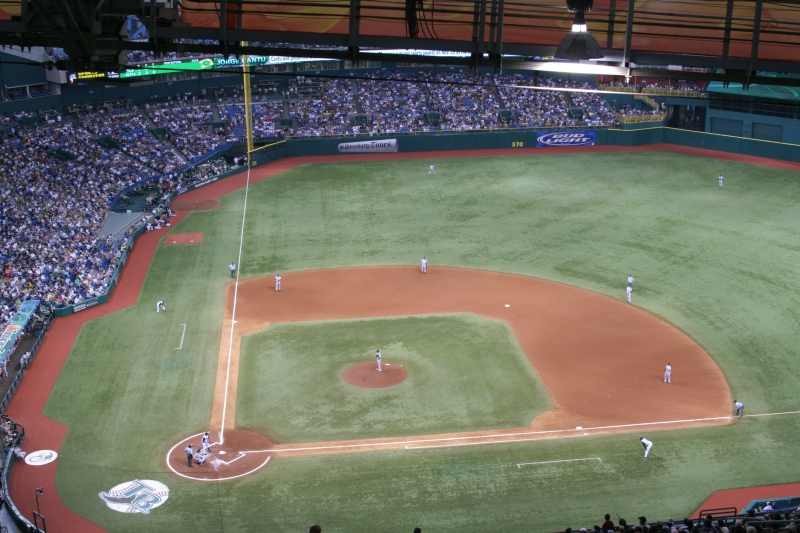
The 2011 Beef 'O' Brady's Bowl was played at Tropicana Field.

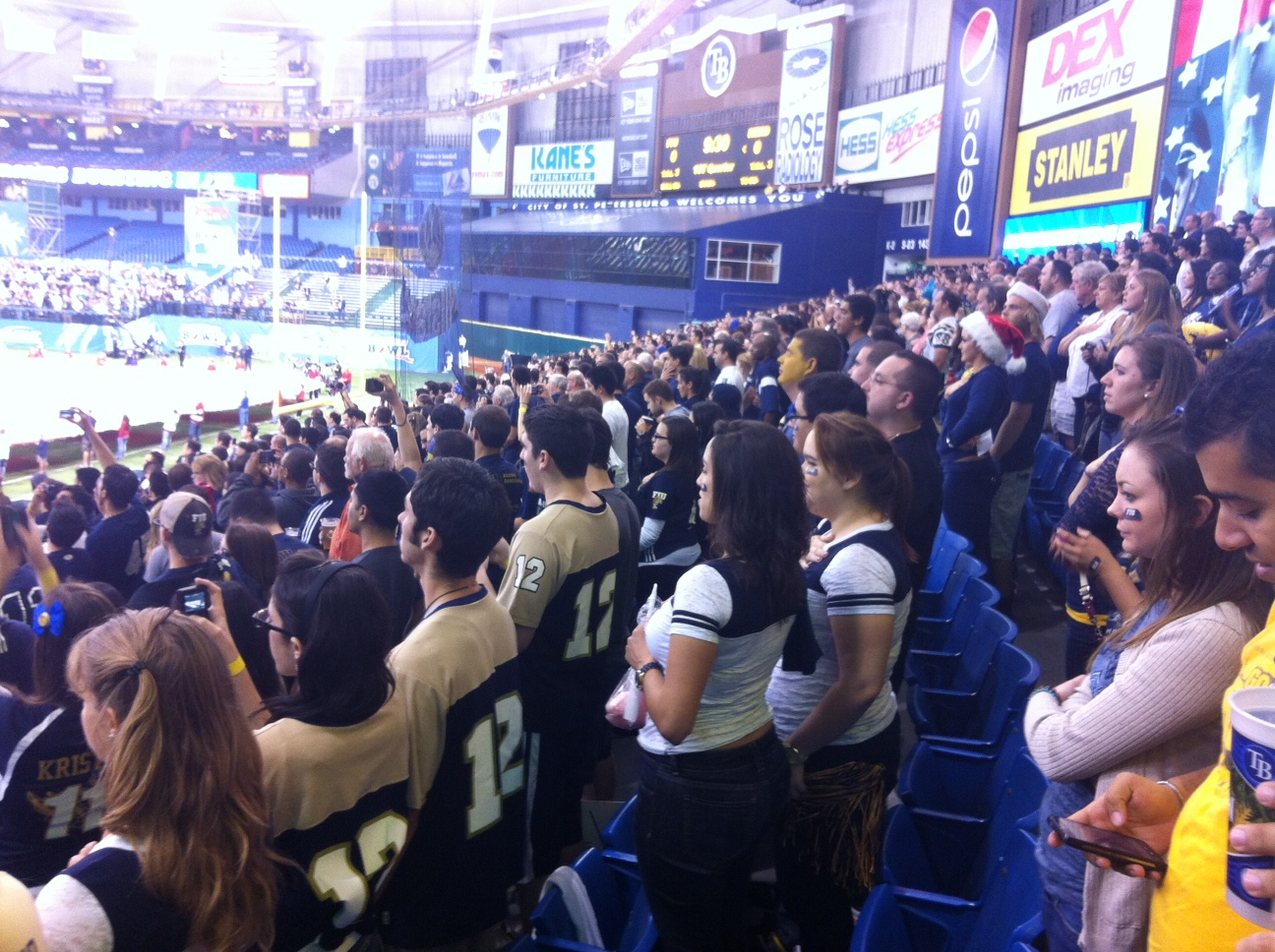
FIU fans at the Beef 'O' Brady's Bowl

Both teams were making their first appearance in the Beef 'O' Brady's Bowl. The bowl game marked the first ever meeting between the two schools.

=== FIU ===
The FIU Panthers entered the bowl 8–4, finishing 4th in the Sun Belt Conference. The 2011 season was the best season yet for the team. FIU also had the best regular season record among all the FBS teams in Florida. The 2011 Beef 'O' Brady's Bowl marked the 2nd bowl appearance in a row for the Panthers and the 2nd bowl game ever for FIU. The team was led by sophomore running back Kedrick Rhodes with 1,121 rushing yards in a season, which ranked second in school history. Rhodes also caught 26 passes for 248 yards in the passing game.

=== Marshall ===
Marshall entered the bowl with a 6–6 record, finishing 2nd in the C-USA-East division. Marshall only became bowl eligible in the final game of the season, in a 34–27 overtime victory over East Carolina. This was the first bowl appearance for Marshall since the 2009 Little Caesars Pizza Bowl, where they beat Ohio 21–17. Marshall has a 6–3 record in bowl games coming into the game.

Defensively, the Thundering Heard created 28 turnovers, ranking 2nd in C-USA. The defense was led by Vinny Curry, the 2011 C-USA Defensive Player of the Year, who six forced fumbles, 1 tackles for loss and 11 sacks.

== Game summary ==
Marshall scored first with a 37-yard field goal from Tyler Warner. FIU responded with 10 unanswered points before Marshall tied the game 10–10 with 23 seconds left in the half on a 31-yard touchdown to wide receiver Aaron Dobson pass from quarterback Rakeem Cato.

The third quarter was a defensive struggle between the two teams, and the game was still tied 10–10 entering the 4th quarter. With less than 8 minutes left regulation, Marshall was able to block a FIU punt near the goal line. However, Marshall penalties backed up the Thundering Herd to the FIU 23-yard line. Despite the penalties, Marshall was still able to score on a 39-yard field goal from Tyler Warner, giving the Thundering Herd a 13–10 lead with only 5:16 left. FIU fumbled on its next possession with 4:24 left in regulation to give the ball back to Marshall. Marshall sealed the victory on a 4th down, 35-yard touchdown pass again to Dobson from Cato to put Marshall up 20–10 with 30 seconds left in the game. Dobson was named the MVP of the bowl game after recording 7 catches for 81 yards and the only two Marshall touchdowns. Dobson's performance out shined the performance of FIU's highly touted receiver T. Y. Hilton.

=== Scoring summary ===
Scoring summary

Quarter	Time	Drive			Team	Scoring information	Score	
Quarter	Time	Plays	Yards	TOP	Team	Scoring information	FIU	MRSH
1	6:37	9	45	4:02	MRSH	37-yard field goal by Tyler Warner	0	3
1	1:31	8	47	3:11	FIU	T. Y. Hilton 2-yard touchdown run, Jack Griffin kick good	7	3
2	5:41	8	36	3:18	FIU	46-yard field goal by Griffin	10	3
2	0:23	6	55	1:15	MRSH	Aaron Dobson 31-yard touchdown reception from Rakeem Cato, Warner kick good	10	10
4	5:16	4	-14	2:19	MRSH	39-yard field goal by Warner	10	13
4	0:30	7	60	3:54	MRSH	Dobson 35-yard touchdown reception from Cato, Warner kick good	10	20
"TOP" = time of possession. For other American football terms, see Glossary of American football.							10	20

=== Statistics ===
Statistics	FIU	MRSH
First downs	12	14
Rushes-yards (net)	27–88	30–84
Passing yards (net)	163	226
Passes, Att-Comp-Int	32–20–0	39–27–1
Total offense, plays – yards	59–251	69–310
Time of Possession	26:51	33:09
