= FIU Panthers football =

Football team representing Florida International University

2026 FIU Panthers football team
- First season: 2002; 24 years ago
- Athletic director: Scott Carr
- Head coach: Willie Simmons; 1st season, 7–6 (.538)
- Location: Westchester, Florida
- Stadium: Pitbull Stadium (capacity: 20,000)
- NCAA division: Division I FBS
- Conference: Conference USA
- Colors: Blue and gold
- All-time record: 99–184 (.350)
- Bowl record: 2–4 (.333)

Conference championships
- SBC: 2010
- Rivalries: Florida Atlantic (rivalry)
- Mascot: Roary the Panther
- Marching band: FIU Marching Band
- Uniform outfitter: Adidas
- Website: fiusports.com

FIU Panthers football program represents Florida International University (FIU) in the sport of American football. The Panthers compete in the Football Bowl Subdivision (FBS) of the National Collegiate Athletic Association (NCAA) and the East Division of Conference USA (CUSA). The Panthers' head coach is Willie Simmons. FIU has produced a Sun Belt Conference co-championship team in 2010, along with 3 postseason bowl appearances. The Panthers play their home games at Pitbull Stadium, which has a seating capacity of 20,000.

== History ==
=== Don Strock era (2002–2006) ===
On 1 September 1999, after several years of contemplating the commencement of a football team, FIU moved a step closer by hiring Don Strock to be FIU's Director of Football Operations. One year later, Strock was named head coach with plans to lay the foundation for a college football team. Quarterback David Tabor was the first FIU football recruit after agreeing to play in 2001.

In February 2002, FIU found its star quarterback in high school, Jamie Burke from Cardinal Mooney High, Sarasota, Florida. Burke was the only player to ever throw for over 500 yards in a single game in Florida as well as led the state in touchdown passes in a season with 34. Burke was being recruited by the University of Florida but opted for FIU when Steve Spurrier left to coach the Washington Redskins. FIU had everything it needed to begin competing in NCAA Football. FIU was placed in the Division I-AA level as an Independent team.

==== 2002 season ====
FIU won its inaugural game on August 29, 2002, against Saint Peter's College (New Jersey), 27–3. The team played fairly well against the competition that season and managed to finish with a 5–6 record.

The Golden Panthers then hoped to build on that in the coming 2003 season. FIU signed to play more challenging teams of the division in hopes to get more recognition as a solid football team.

==== 2003 season ====
The opening game of the 2003 season started with a loss to Indiana State, and it led to a 0–8 start for the second-year team. They failed to reach the standard set the season before and fell to a 2–10 season.

==== 2004 season ====
The 2004 season followed with similar results, finishing with a 3–7 record.

After the 2004 season, FIU moved up to Division I FBS, formerly known as Division I-A, despite their relative lack of success in their first three seasons in Division I FCS. FIU became the fastest school in the history of college football to reach the highest level. This has since been eclipsed by multiple schools during the conference movement in 2012.

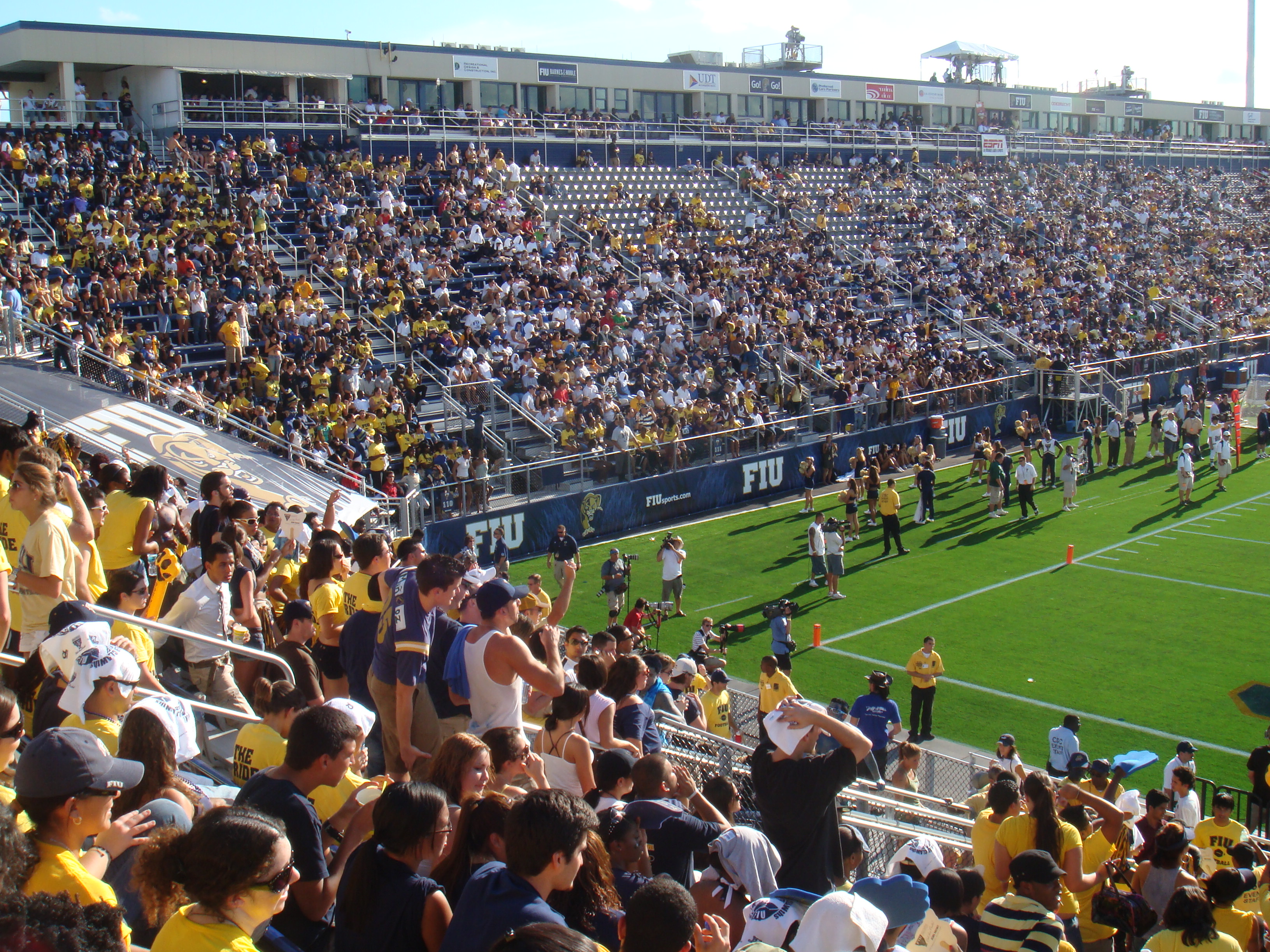
The Panthers play at the on-campus Riccardo Silva Stadium in University Park, Florida.

==== 2005 season ====
With the Panthers' move to Division I-A in 2005, many of the season's players were from the 2003 recruiting class. Keyonvis Bouie, FIU's linebacker recorded 118 tackles in nine games, 11 for a loss and three interceptions. A second linebacker, Antwan Barnes recorded 15 tackles for a loss and added 11 sacks to his statistics. On offense, FIU's quarterback, Josh Padrick who passed for 2743 yards and 13 touchdowns. His primary target was Chandler Williams, who caught 61 passes for a total of 870 yards. It was these defensive performances that allowed FIU to compete with the teams in Division I-A and finish the season 5–6.

FIU had found the foundation upon which the team would be built. As characteristic of FIU's athletic department, the following year, FIU signed to play harder teams. FIU was headed in the right direction but still lacked consistency, and organization.

==== 2006 season ====
As the Panthers' began their 2006 season they almost evenly matched the teams which they played, losing almost all of their first few games by very narrow margins: Middle Tennessee 7–6, USF 21–20, Bowling Green 33–28, and Maryland 14–10.

On October 7, 2006, FIU lost to the University of North Texas, 22–25 in 7 overtimes, tying the record for the most overtimes played in college football at the time.

On October 14, 2006, FIU and the Miami Hurricanes met for the first time in what was supposed to be the beginning of an annual cross-town rivalry game. Nine minutes into the second half the two teams engaged in a brawl involving players from both schools, including one injured FIU player on crutches and one UM player using his helmet as a weapon.

The violence later spilled into the stands, where several spectators were arrested and later released without charges.

31 players were punished for the incident, including 13 Miami players and 18 FIU players. Two FIU players were kicked off the team.

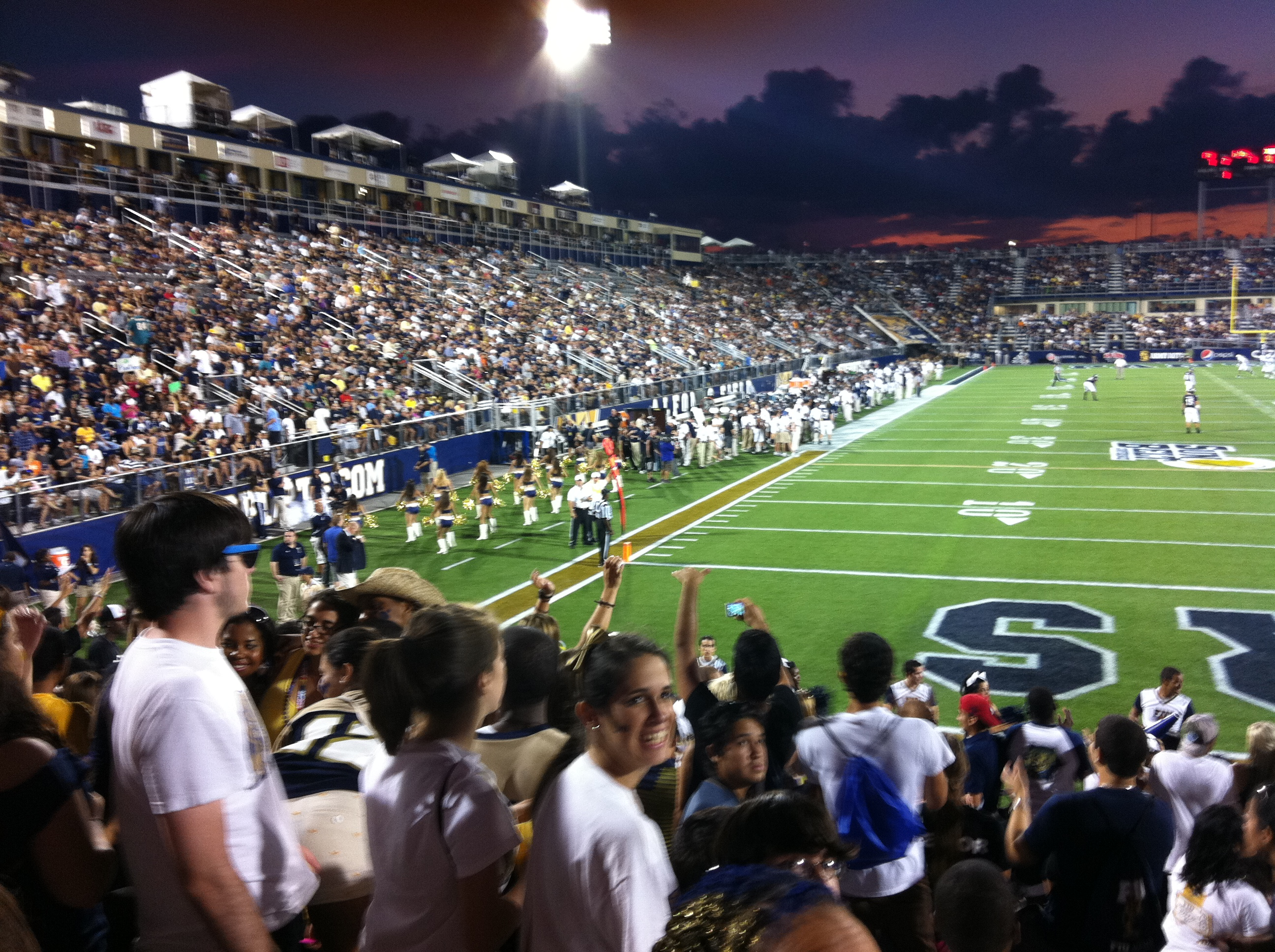
Riccardo Silva Stadium during the 2011 Homecoming game versus Duke University.

The FIU defense still finished 28th nationally, and 4th in pass defense. Antwan Barnes ranked 3rd in the nation in tackles for loss with 22 and 6 sacks. Bouie gained 119 tackles 18 for loss, and Alexander Bostic would add 98 tackles, 19 for loss and 8 sacks. Barnes, Bouie and, Bostic came to be known as the "Killer B's". On offense, FIU's receiver Chandler Williams, caught 67 passes for 664 yards.

=== Mario Cristobal era (2007–2012) ===
In 2006, Barnes and Williams were both drafted to the NFL. That same year, the FIU Athletics Department hired a new athletic director Pete Garcia, and found a new head coach for the team, Mario Cristobal. Cristobal became the second youngest Division I-A coach at 37. Cristobal brought in a new coaching staff in hopes to turn the program around.

==== 2007 season ====
In 2007, FIU was the second-youngest team in Division I-A. 2/3 were underclassmen, mostly freshmen. During the 2007 season, FIU played its home games in the Miami Orange Bowl during the expansion of Riccardo Silva Stadium to 20,000 seats.

The Golden Panthers concluded the season with a win against North Texas 38–19. It was the last college football game ever played at the historic Orange Bowl prior to its demolition and the last home win at that stadium.

==== 2008 season ====
In September 2008, the Panthers inaugurated the expanded Riccardo Silva Stadium by hosting the South Florida Bulls with a crowd of over 16,000. FIU lost the game 17–9. The team would go on to win the next three games in a showing of a much improved team from the 2006 and 2007 team.

==== 2009 season ====
FIU struggled in its 2009 season, ultimately posting a 3-9 overall record. The Golden Panthers went 3-5 in the Sun Belt Conference. Their 3 victories came against the Western Kentucky Hilltoppers 37-20, the Louisiana Ragin' Cajuns 20-17 (1OT), and the North Texas Mean Green 35-28.

=== 2010 season & First conference title ===
On Saturday, November 27, 2010, FIU led by Cristobal defeated Arkansas State 31–24 to clinch the program's first Sun Belt Conference Title. This earned the Panthers its first bowl berth in the short history of its football program.

Twenty-nine days later, on December 26, they became Little Caesars Champions. Fans brought signs saying, "¡Sí se puede!", Spanish for "Yes we can!"

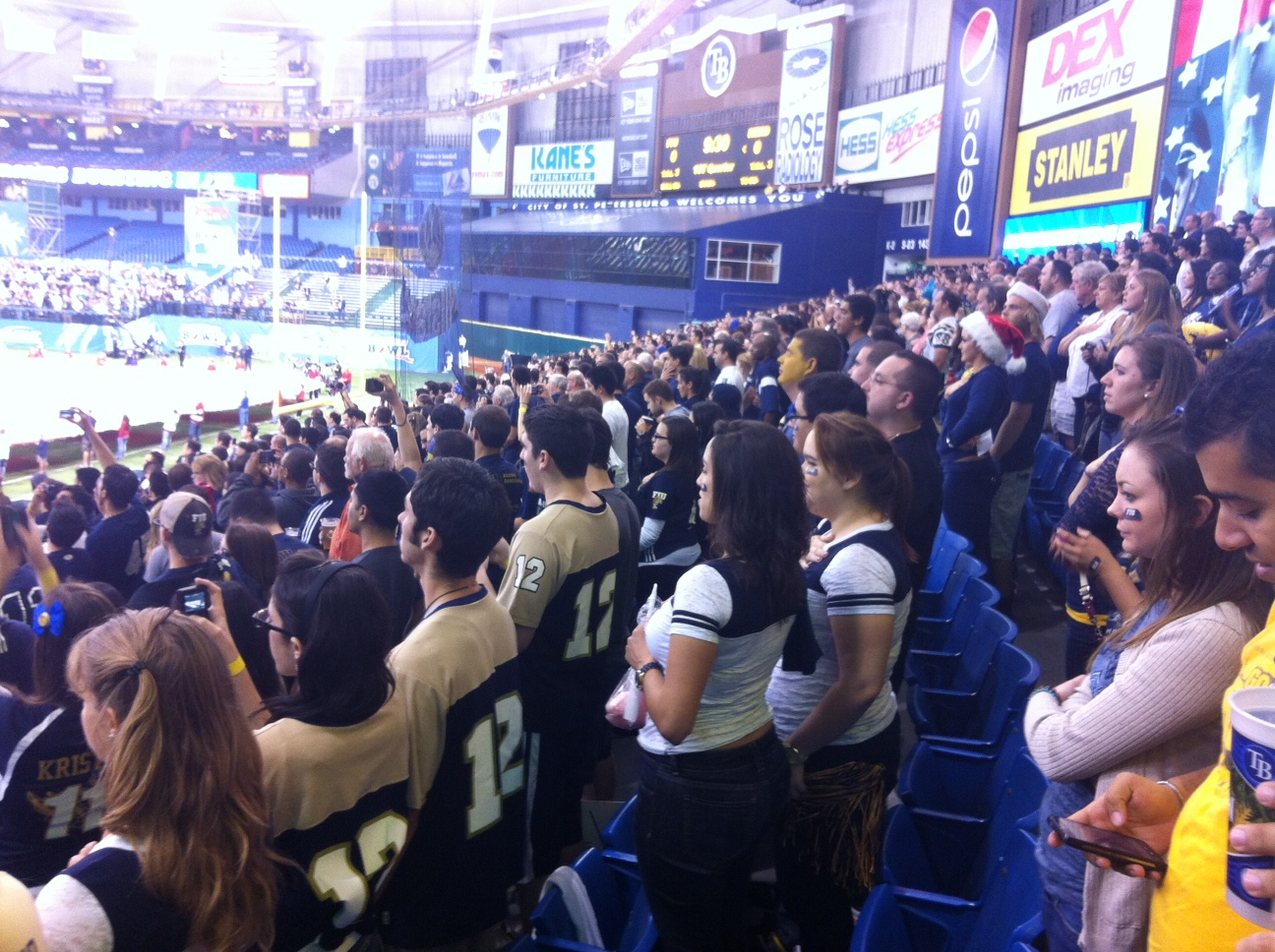
Panther fans at the 2011 Beef 'O' Brady's Bowl.

==== 2011 season ====
FIU turned in a winning result for its 2011 campaign, notching a 8-5 overall record, with a 5-3 Sun Belt Conference result. This was Cristobal's second winning season in a row. On December 3, 2011, FIU accepted an invitation to play in the 2011 Beef 'O' Brady's Bowl, the school's second consecutive bowl game.

==== 2012 season ====
After going from an 8–5 season in 2011 to a 3–9 season in 2012, FIU Athletic Director Pete Garcia made the decision to fire Cristobal because "we’ve gone backwards over the last year and a half. Over the last 22 games, we've gone 11–14." Garcia openly coveted Butch Davis to replace Cristobal. The decision was heavily criticized.

=== Ron Turner era (2013–2016) ===
On January 3, 2013, FIU hired Ron Turner, former head coach at San Jose State and Illinois, as the program's third head coach. The Panthers failed to make a bowl game appearance during his tenure, posting a 1–11 record in 2013 followed by a 4–8 record in 2014 and a 5–7 record in 2015. After FIU suffered an 0–4 start to the 2016 campaign including blowout losses to Maryland and in-state rival UCF, Turner was fired on September 25, 2016. Ron Cooper replaced him as an interim head coach until the end of the season.

=== Butch Davis era (2017–2021) ===
On November 15, 2016, former Miami and North Carolina head coach Butch Davis, who was serving as a college football analyst at ESPN at the time, was named the fifth head coach of the Panthers. Coach Davis led the Panthers to three consecutive seasons of bowl eligibility. Notably, on November 23, 2019, FIU defeated the Miami Hurricanes by a score of 30–24, with FIU quarterback James Morgan throwing for two touchdown passes in the upset of their crosstown rival. However, after going a combined 1–16 in 2020 and 2021, FIU declined to renew Davis after 2021, ending his 5-year tenure.

=== Mike MacIntyre era (2022–2024) ===
On December 9, 2021, Memphis defensive coordinator Mike MacIntyre, formerly head coach at San Jose State and Colorado, was named the 6th head coach of the program.

=== Willie Simmons era (2024–present) ===
On December 7, 2024, Willie Simmons was named the 7th head coach in FIU Football history. Simmons previously held the Running Backs coach position at Duke University for the 2024 college football season. Prior to his time at Duke, Simmons held the head coaching job at Florida A&M University where he won the 2023 Celebration Bowl against the Howard Bison. Simmons holds a career head coaching record of 66-24 over 6 seasons at FAMU and Prairie View.

== Conference affiliations ==
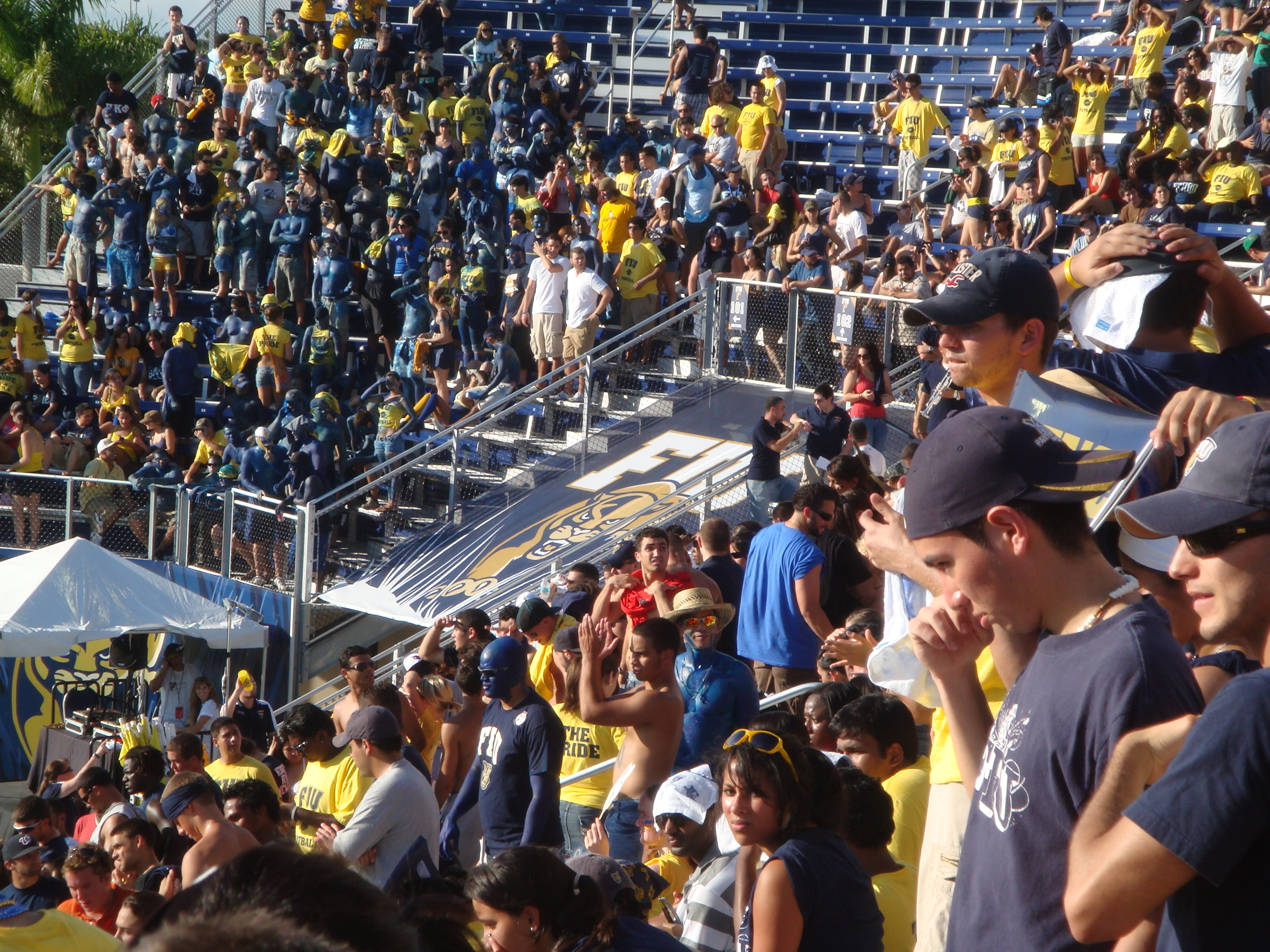
FIU fans at the 2008 home opener game at Riccardo Silva Stadium versus South Florida.

- Independent (2002–2004)
- Sun Belt Conference (2005–2012)
- Conference USA (2013–present)

== Conference championships ==
FIU has won one conference championship.

Year	Conference	Coach	Record	Conference Record
2010†	Sun Belt Conference	Mario Cristobal	7–6	6–2

† Co-champions

== Bowl games ==
FIU has played in six bowl games, compiling a record of 2–4.

Year	Coach	Bowl	Opponent	Result
2010	Mario Cristobal	Little Caesars Pizza Bowl	Toledo	W 34–32
2011	Mario Cristobal	Beef 'O' Brady's Bowl	Marshall	L 10–20
2017	Butch Davis	Gasparilla Bowl	Temple	L 3–28
2018	Butch Davis	Bahamas Bowl	Toledo	W 35–32
2019	Butch Davis	Camellia Bowl	Arkansas State	L 26–34
2025	Willie Simmons	First Responder Bowl	UTSA	L 20–57

== Head coaches ==
There have been 7 different head coaching tenures at FIU.

No.	Tenure	Coach	Seasons	Games	Record	Pct.
1	2002–2006	Don Strock	5	56	5–41†	.109
2	2007–2012	Mario Cristobal	6	74	27–47	.365
3	2013–2016	Ron Turner	4	40	10–30	.250
4	2016	Ron Cooper‡	1	8	4–4	.500
5	2017–2021	Butch Davis	5	39	24–32	.429
6	2022–2024	Mike MacIntyre	3	36	12-24	.333
7	2025–present	Willie Simmons	1	13	7-6	.538

† 10 wins later vacated due to NCAA sanctions, 15–41 record on-field.

‡ Interim head coach

== Rivalries ==
=== Florida Atlantic ===
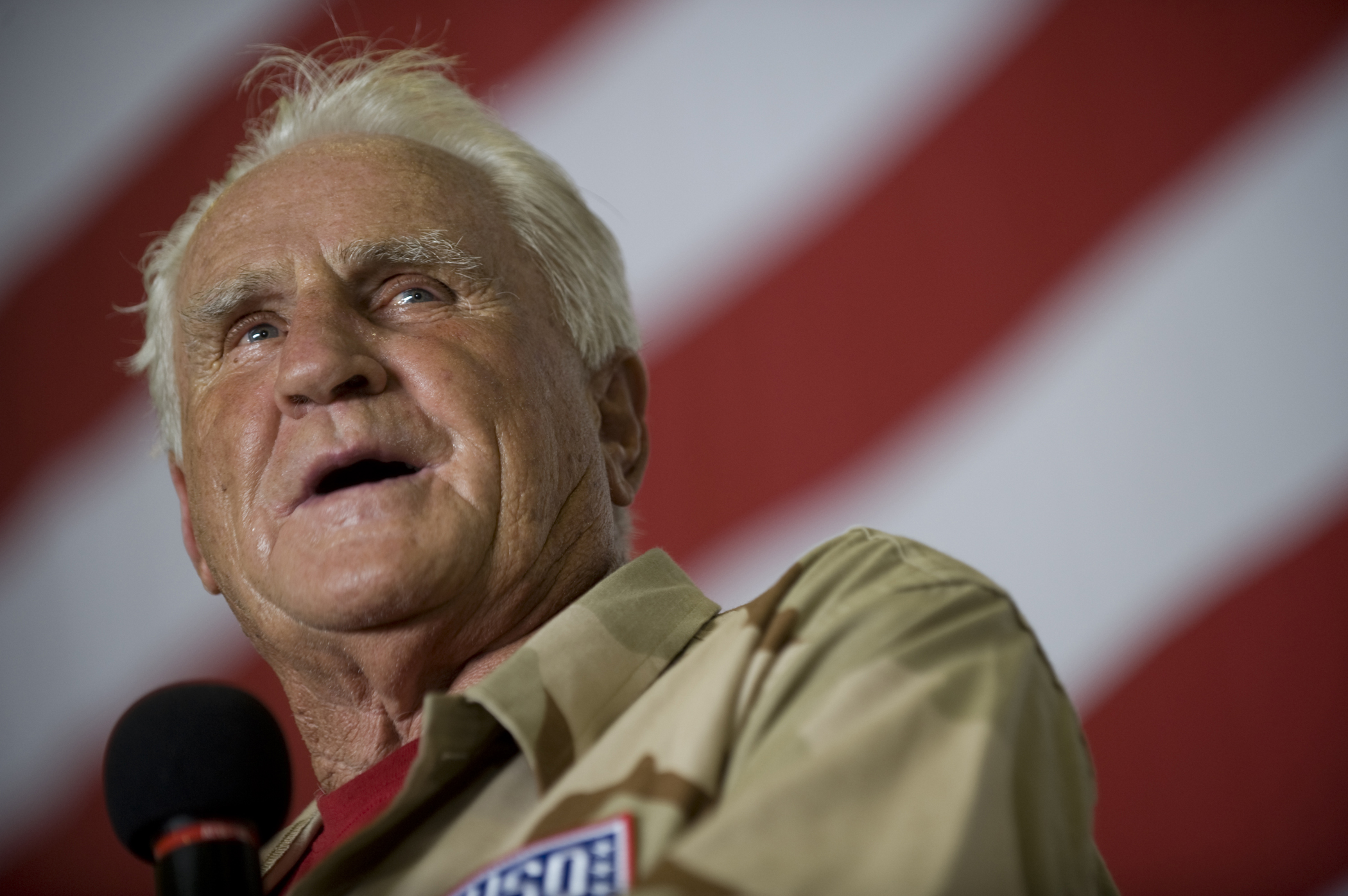
NFL Hall of Famer Don Shula 1997.

The Shula Bowl is the rivalry game against Florida Atlantic. It was first played in 2002, and has been played every year since then. The winner receives the Don Shula Award. The game and trophy are named after former Miami Dolphins head coach, Don Shula. The game is typically either in Boca Raton at Florida Atlantic University or University Park at Florida International University, though there have been meetings in other locations in the Miami metropolitan area. In total the two squads have met 17 times with Florida Atlantic holding a 16–5 lead as of the 2013 season conclusion. The 2005 game does not count with FIU having to vacate their victory due to NCAA violations and penalties.

== Future non-conference opponents ==
Announced schedules as of November 3, 2026.

2027	2028	2029	2030	2031	2033
at Illinois	Old Dominion	at North Texas	at UCF	at Old Dominion	at Western Michigan
at Buffalo		South Florida	Western Michigan		
Florida Atlantic					
UConn					

== Bibliography ==
- ESPN College Football Encyclopedia: The Complete history of the Game (ISBN 1-4013-3703-1)
