= 2010 FIU Panthers football team =

American college football season

2010 FIU Panthers football

Sun Belt co-champion Little Caesars Pizza Bowl champion

Little Caesars Pizza Bowl, W 34–32 vs. Toledo
- Conference: Sun Belt Conference
- Record: 7–6 (6–2 Sun Belt)
- Head coach: Mario Cristobal (4th season)
- Offensive coordinator: Scott Satterfield (1st season)
- Offensive scheme: Spread option
- Defensive coordinator: Geoff Collins (1st season)
- Base defense: 4–3
- Home stadium: FIU Stadium

2010 Sun Belt Conference football standings
	Conf.			Overall
Team	W		L	W		L
Troy +	6	–	2	8	–	5
FIU +	6	–	2	7	–	6
Middle Tennessee	5	–	3	6	–	7
Louisiana–Monroe	4	–	4	5	–	7
Arkansas State	4	–	4	4	–	8
Florida Atlantic	3	–	5	4	–	8
Louisiana–Lafayette	3	–	5	3	–	9
North Texas	3	–	5	3	–	9
Western Kentucky	2	–	6	2	–	10
+ – Conference co-champions

The 2010 FIU Panthers football team represented Florida International University during the 2010 NCAA Division I FBS football season. The team was coached by Mario Cristobal and played their homes games at the on-campus FIU Stadium in Miami.

On November 27, 2010, the FIU Panthers won a share of their first ever Sun Belt Conference championship and became eligible to compete in a post-season bowl game for the first time in school history. The Panthers had the opportunity to win the Sun Belt Conference outright but faltered against the Middle Tennessee State Blue Raiders in the final game of regular season, 27–28. At the end of the regular season, FIU accepted an invitation to play in the Little Caesars Pizza Bowl on December 26, 2010, where they faced Toledo of the Mid-American Conference. FIU defeated Toledo 34–32, and clinched the school's first ever bowl game victory on the final play of the game with a 34-yard field goal by kicker Jack Griffin. FIU finished the 2010 season with a record of 7–6 (6–2 Sun Belt) and first winning season in school history.

The Rutgers University home opener game on September 11, 2010 broke attendance records at FIU Stadium for the season, with a record crowd of 19,872.

== Schedule ==
Date	Time	Opponent	Site	TV	Result	Attendance
September 11	8:00 p.m.	Rutgers*	FIU Stadium; Miami, FL	ESPN+	L 14–19	19,872
September 18	7:00 p.m.	at Texas A&M*	Kyle Field; College Station, TX		L 20–27	79,069
September 25	12:00 p.m.	at Maryland*	Byrd Stadium; College Park, MD	ESPNU	L 28–42	33,254
October 2	3:30 p.m.	at Pittsburgh*	Heinz Field; Pittsburgh, PA	ESPN3	L 17–44	45,207
October 9	3:30 p.m.	Western Kentucky	FIU Stadium; Miami, FL	CST/CSS	W 28–21	14,335
October 16	3:30 p.m.	at North Texas	Fouts Field; Denton, TX	CST/CSS	W 34–10	14,718
October 30	4:00 p.m.	at Florida Atlantic	Lockhart Stadium; Fort Lauderdale, FL (Shula Bowl)		L 9–21	17,543
November 6	6:00 p.m.	Louisiana-Monroe^{†}	FIU Stadium; Miami, FL	CST/CSS	W 42–35 ^{2OT}	17,301
November 13	3:30 p.m.	at Troy	Veterans Memorial Stadium; Troy, AL	CST/CSS	W 52–35	20,243
November 20	7:00 p.m.	at Louisiana-Lafayette	Cajun Field; Lafayette, LA		W 38–17	13,041
November 27	3:30 p.m.	Arkansas State	FIU Stadium; Miami, FL	CST/CSS	W 31–24	14,588
December 4	6:00 p.m.	Middle Tennessee	FIU Stadium; Miami, FL	ESPN3	L 27–28	16,628
December 26	8:30 p.m.	vs. Toledo*	Ford Field; Detroit, MI (Little Caesars Pizza Bowl)	ESPN	W 34–32	32,431
*Non-conference game; ^{†}Homecoming; All times are in Eastern time

== Awards and honors ==
=== Post-season awards and honors ===
- Sun Belt Conference Player of the Year: T. Y. Hilton (WR, Jr.)
- Sun Belt Conference Coach of the Year: Mario Cristobal

=== All-Sun Belt honors ===
- First Team All-Sun Belt Conference:
  - T. Y. Hilton (WR & Return Specialist, Jr.)
  - Brad Serini (OL, Sr.)
  - Jarvis Wilson (DL, Sr.)
  - Toronto Smith (LB, Sr.)
  - Anthony Gaitor (DB, Sr.)
- Second Team All-Sun Belt Conference:
  - Darriet Perry (RB, Jr.)
  - Tourek Williams (DL, So.)
  - Johnathan Cyprien (DB, So.)
  - T. Y. Hilton (All-Purpose, Jr.)
- Honorable Mention All-Sun Belt Conference:
  - Greg Ellingson (WR, Sr.)
  - Winston Fraser (LB, R-So.)

== NFL draft ==
7th Round, 222nd Overall Pick by the Tampa Bay Buccaneers—Sr. CB Anthony Gaitor
