= 2025 Cotton Bowl Classic =

2025 Cotton Bowl Classic may refer to:

- 2025 Cotton Bowl Classic (January), a bowl game on January 10, 2025, featuring Ohio State and Texas
- 2025 Cotton Bowl Classic (December), a bowl game on December 31, 2025, featuring Ohio State and Miami (FL)

== See also ==
- Cotton Bowl Classic
