= 2010 Little Caesars Pizza Bowl =

FIU Panthers	Toledo Rockets
(6–6)	(8–4)
Sun Belt	MAC
34	32
Head coach: Mario Cristobal	Head coach: Tim Beckman
	1	2	3	4	Total
FIU	0	7	14	13	34
Toledo	7	14	3	8	32
- Date: December 26, 2010
- Season: 2010
- Stadium: Ford Field
- Location: Detroit, Michigan
- MVP: WR T. Y. Hilton, FIU
- Favorite: Toledo by 1
- Referee: Ron Cherry (ACC)
- Attendance: 32,431
- Payout: US$750,000

United States TV coverage
- Network: ESPN
- Announcers: Dave LaMont, J. C. Pearson and Quint Kessenich
- Nielsen ratings: 1.6/1.629 million viewers

The 2010 Little Caesars Pizza Bowl was an NCAA bowl game (previously the Motor City Bowl game) played at 8:30 p.m. EST on December 26, 2010 at Ford Field in Detroit, Michigan and aired on ESPN. The bowl game matched up the Florida International Panthers of the Sun Belt Conference against the Toledo Rockets of the Mid-American Conference.

The game was the 14th installment of the bowl game played in Detroit.

== Teams ==
=== Florida International ===
Florida International played in its first bowl game in school history. The Panthers were the 2010 Sun Belt Conference Champions. They came into the game with a 6-6 overall record. They were led by an outstanding defense that had helped them almost pull off upsets against Rutgers and Texas A&M. FIU was invited to play in the bowl as the Big Ten Conference was unable to fill its slot in the contest.

=== Toledo ===
Toledo entered the bowl with an 8-4 overall record. The Rockets were making their first bowl appearance since 2005 when they defeated UTEP in the GMAC Bowl. Three of its four losses this season were to bowl-bound teams: Boise State, Northern Illinois and Arizona. This was the fourth time in school history that the Rockets played in the Little Caesars Pizza Bowl. They played in the game when it was known as the Motor City Bowl in 2001, 2002, and 2004. They were 1-2 in previous matchups with their only win coming in 2001 against Cincinnati.

== Game summary ==
=== Scoring ===
Scoring Play	Score
1st Quarter
TOL - Adonis Thomas 4-yard run (Bill Claus kick), 5:40	TOL 7–0
2nd Quarter
TOL - Adonis Thomas 87-yard run (Bill Claus kick), 10:45	TOL 14–0
FIU - Darriet Perry 1-yard run (Jack Griffin kick), 6:25	TOL 14–7
TOL - Terrance Owens 10-yard pass to Danny Noble (Bill Claus kick), 2:56	TOL 21–7
3rd Quarter
TOL - Bill Claus 29 yard kick, 9:44	TOL 24–7
FIU - T. Y. Hilton 89-yard kickoff return (Jack Griffin kick), 9:32	TOL 24–14
FIU - Darriet Perry 7-yard run (Jack Griffin kick), 6:45	TOL 24–21
4th Quarter
FIU - Wesley Carroll 10-yard pass to T. Y. Hilton (Jack Griffin kick), 7:34	FIU 28–24
FIU - Jack Griffin 31 yard kick, 3:18	FIU 31–24
TOL - Terrance Owens 14-yard run (Two point conversion), 1:14	TOL 32–31
FIU - Jack Griffin 34 yard kick, 0:00	FIU 34–32

=== Statistics ===
Statistic	FIU	Toledo
First downs	15	24
Total offense, plays-yards	65–308	70–436
Rushes-yards (net)	37–168	43–305
Passes, Comp-Att-Yds	16-28-140	15-27-131
Fumbles-Interceptions	0–1	1–3
Time of Possession	28:38	31:22

== Game notes ==
The Little Caesars Pizza Bowl marked the first ever bowl meeting between the two schools. However, these two schools have met twice before in 2008 and 2009 with each University splitting the results. FIU leads the series 3-1.
