= Shula Bowl =

Annual college American football game

- Florida Atlantic Owls FIU Panthers
- Sport: Football
- First meeting: November 23, 2002; Florida Atlantic 31, FIU 21
- Latest meeting: September 19, 2026; Florida Atlantic 16, FIU 10
- Next meeting: September 18, 2027
- Trophy: Don Shula Award

Statistics
- Total meetings: 24
- All-time series: Florida Atlantic leads, 18–5
- Largest victory: Florida Atlantic, 52–7 (2022)
- Longest win streak: Florida Atlantic, 7 (2017–2024)
- Current win streak: Florida Atlantic, 1 (2026–present)

Locations of Florida Atlantic and FIU in the Miami metropolitan area

The Shula Bowl is the name given to the Florida Atlantic–Florida International football rivalry. It is an annual college football rivalry game between the only two public universities in the Miami metropolitan area: Florida Atlantic University (FAU) in Boca Raton and Florida International University (FIU) in University Park. The game's winner receives a traveling trophy, the "Don Shula Award," for one year. The current winner is Florida Atlantic, winning 16–10 on September 19, 2026. Florida Atlantic leads the all-time series 18 games to 5.

The game and trophy are named after former Miami Dolphins head coach Don Shula. Don Shula was the head coach of the Miami Dolphins from 1970 to 1995. Each school's first head coach has previous ties to Don Shula. Florida Atlantic's first head coach Howard Schnellenberger was an assistant of Shula in the 1970s, and FIU's first head coach Don Strock was a player under Shula in the 1970s and 1980s. Don Shula set numerous records as head coach of the Miami Dolphins and his legacy is seen throughout the Miami area. The Shula Bowl pays homage to Shula, to South Florida football and the ties and history of both universities.

== Game location ==
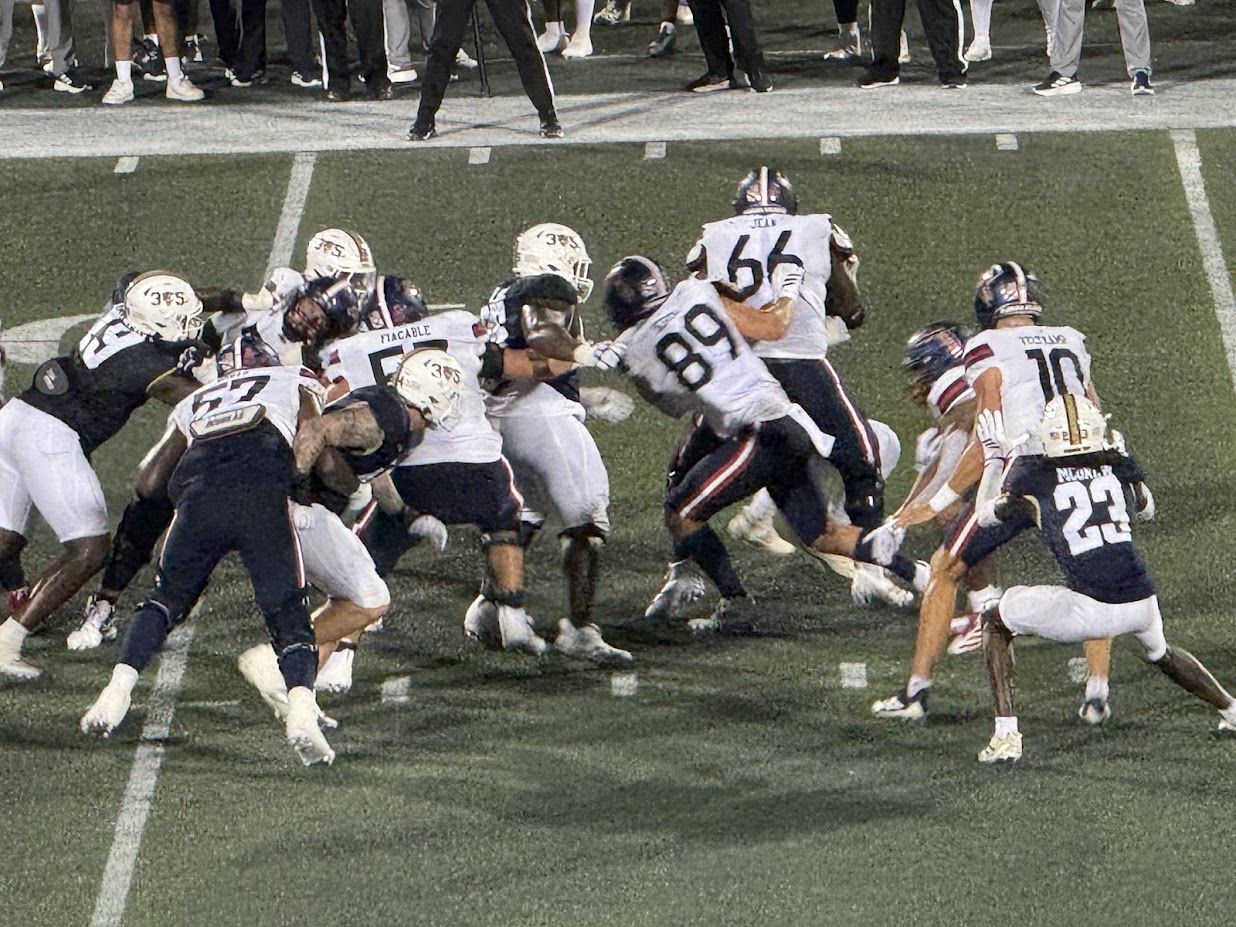
Scrimmage during the 2025 game

The Shula Bowl was first played at Hard Rock Stadium, then known as Pro Player Stadium, in present-day Miami Gardens, Florida, on November 23, 2002. The game now alternates between Florida Atlantic and FIU's home fields. Until 2010, Florida Atlantic used Pro Player Stadium (later renamed Dolphin Stadium in 2006) as its home field, where FIU has almost always used the on-campus venue now known as FIU Stadium as its home field. On one occasion, in 2007, FIU used the Miami Orange Bowl in Little Havana, Miami, as its home field, while FIU Stadium was undergoing an expansion. The 2007 game was played in the final months of the Orange Bowl before being demolished for the construction of LoanDepot Park. Beginning in 2012, Florida Atlantic used its newly built FAU Stadium in Boca Raton as its home field, marking the first time the Shula Bowl was played on both rival schools' campuses.

== Television ==
For years the game was telecast on the ESPN family of networks through an agreement to broadcast games in the Sun Belt Conference. In 2013, both schools moved to Conference USA, and the game was instead aired on Fox Sports 1, as C-USA did not air games on the ESPN networks (save for the conference championship game). In recent years the game has aired on Stadium and is carried locally on WSFL-TV The CW South Florida.

== Future ==
It was announced in 2021 that FAU was set to leave Conference USA for the American Athletic Conference beginning in the 2023–24 school year, making it unclear whether the rivalry series would continue in the current format. It was presumed that football in particular would be on hiatus until at least 2024, because that would be the next year when both teams would have openings in their non-conference schedules.

In a statement announced on September 26, 2022, the FAU and FIU athletics departments inked a four-game series that would continue the Shula Bowl beginning in 2024.

== Game results ==
Florida Atlantic victories	FIU victories	Tie games

No.	Date	Location	Winner	Score
1	November 23, 2002	Miami Gardens	Florida Atlantic	31–21
2	November 22, 2003	Miami (FIU Stadium)	Florida Atlantic	32–23
3	December 4, 2004	Miami Gardens	Florida Atlantic	17–10
4	November 26, 2005	Miami (FIU Stadium)	FIU†	52–6
5	November 25, 2006	Miami Gardens	Florida Atlantic	31–0
6	November 24, 2007	Miami (Orange Bowl)	Florida Atlantic	55–23
7	November 29, 2008	Miami Gardens	Florida Atlantic	57–50
8	December 5, 2009	Miami (FIU Stadium)	Florida Atlantic	28–21
9	October 30, 2010	Fort Lauderdale	Florida Atlantic	21–9
10	November 12, 2011	Miami (FIU Stadium)	FIU	41–7
11	November 16, 2012	Boca Raton	FIU	34–24
12	November 29, 2013	Boca Raton	Florida Atlantic	21–6
13	October 2, 2014	Miami (FIU Stadium)	FIU	38–10

No.	Date	Location	Winner	Score
14	October 31, 2015	Boca Raton	Florida Atlantic	31–17
15	October 1, 2016	Miami (FIU Stadium)	FIU	33–31
16	November 18, 2017	Boca Raton	Florida Atlantic	52–24
17	November 3, 2018	Miami (FIU Stadium)	Florida Atlantic	49–14
18	November 9, 2019	Boca Raton	Florida Atlantic	37–7
19	November 13, 2020	Miami (FIU Stadium)	Florida Atlantic	38–19
20	October 2, 2021	Boca Raton	Florida Atlantic	58–21
21	November 12, 2022	Miami (FIU Stadium)	Florida Atlantic	52–7
22	September 14, 2024	Boca Raton	Florida Atlantic	38–20
23	September 13, 2025	Miami (FIU Stadium)	FIU	38–28
24	September 19, 2026	Boca Raton	Florida Atlantic	16–10
Series: Florida Atlantic leads 18–5
† FIU vacated as part of NCAA penalties.

== See also ==
- List of NCAA college football rivalry games
