= Charlotte 49ers football statistical leaders =

The Charlotte 49ers football statistical leaders are individual statistical leaders of the Charlotte 49ers football program in various categories, including passing, rushing, receiving, total offense, defensive stats, and kicking. Within those areas, the lists identify single-game, single season and career leaders. The 49ers represent the University of North Carolina at Charlotte in the NCAA Division I FBS American Conference.

Charlotte, then a 2-year college called the Charlotte Center of the University of North Carolina, played 3 years of intercollegiate football from 1946 through 1948. Records from this period are intermittent, and therefore player statistics from those seasons are not included on the lists below. Charlotte restated its football program in 2013. These statistics are updated through the end of the 2025 season.

== Passing ==
=== Passing yards ===
Career
Rank	Player	Yards	Years
1	Chris Reynolds	10,270	2018 2019 2020 2021 2022
2	Matt Johnson	5,405	2013 2014 2015 2016
3	Hasaan Klugh	3,242	2016 2017 2018
4	Lee McNeil	1,892	2013 2014 2015 2016
5	Deshawn Purdie	1,802	2024
6	Trexler Ivey	1,690	2022 2023 2024
7	Grayson Loftis	1,450	2025
8	Kevin Olsen	842	2016
9	Conner Harrell	737	2025
10	Jalon Jones	641	2023

Single season
Rank	Player	Yards	Year
1	Chris Reynolds	2,680	2021
2	Matt Johnson	2,581	2013
3	Chris Reynolds	2,564	2019
4	Chris Reynolds	2,540	2022
5	Matt Johnson	1,941	2014
6	Deshawn Purdie	1,802	2024
7	Hasaan Klugh	1,524	2017
8	Grayson Loftis	1,450	2025
9	Hasaan Klugh	1,356	2016
10	Chris Reynolds	1,305	2020

Single game
Rank	Player	Yards	Year	Opponent
1	Chris Reynolds	448	2021	Louisiana Tech
2	Chris Reynolds	401	2022	Georgia State
3	Deshawn Purdie	396	2024	Florida Atlantic
4	Conner Harrell	382	2025	Monmouth
5	Matt Johnson	358	2014	The Citadel
6	Chris Reynolds	354	2019	UTEP
7	Chris Reynolds	347	2022	UTEP
8	Matt Johnson	342	2013	Gardner-Webb
9	Chris Reynolds	339	2021	Middle Tennessee
10	Chris Reynolds	336	2019	North Texas

=== Passing touchdowns ===
Career
Rank	Player	TDs	Years
1	Chris Reynolds	84	2018 2019 2020 2021 2022
2	Matt Johnson	42	2013 2014 2015 2016
3	Hasaan Klugh	22	2016 2017 2018
4	Deshawn Purdie	10	2024
5	Lee McNeill	8	2013 2014 2015 2016
	Trexler Ivey	8	2022 2023 2024
	Grayson Loftis	8	2025
8	Kevin Olsen	6	2016
9	Brooks Barden	4	2015 2017
	Conner Harrell	4	2025

Single season
Rank	Player	TDs	Year
1	Chris Reynolds	26	2021
2	Chris Reynolds	22	2022
	Chris Reynolds	22	2019
4	Matt Johnson	21	2013
5	Matt Johnson	13	2014
6	Deshawn Purdie	10	2024
	Hasaan Klugh	10	2016
	Hasaan Klugh	10	2017
9	Chris Reynolds	8	2020
	Grayson Loftis	8	2025

Single game
Rank	Player	TDs	Year	Opponent
1	Matt Johnson	5	2013	Chowan
	Matt Johnson	5	2013	Gardner-Webb
	Chris Reynolds	5	2022	Georgia State
	Chris Reynolds	5	2022	Rice
5	Chris Reynolds	4	2019	Appalachian State
	Matt Johnson	4	2013	The Citadel
	Chris Reynolds	4	2021	Middle Tennessee
	Chris Reynolds	4	2021	Florida International
	Chris Reynolds	4	2022	UTEP

== Rushing ==
=== Rushing yards ===
Career
Rank	Player	Yards	Years
1	Kalif Phillips	4,031	2013 2014 2015 2016
2	Benny LeMay	3,232	2016 2017 2018 2019
3	Aaron McAllister	1,487	2017 2018 2019 2020
4	Shadrick Byrd	1,414	2021 2022 2023
5	Matt Johnson	1,277	2013 2014 2015 2016
6	Hasaan Klugh	1,162	2016 2017 2018
7	Calvin Camp	1,007	2018 2020 2021 2022
8	Hahsaun Wilson	885	2022 2023 2024
9	Chris Reynolds	873	2018 2019 2020 2021 2022
10	Alan Barnwell	636	2013

Single season
Rank	Player	Yards	Year
1	Kalif Phillips	1,441	2014
2	Benny LeMay	1,243	2018
3	Benny LeMay	1,082	2019
4	Kalif Phillips	967	2015
5	Kalif Phillips	907	2016
6	Chris Reynolds	767	2019
7	Benny LeMay	732	2017
8	Kalif Phillips	716	2013
9	Alan Barnwell	636	2013

Single game
Rank	Player	Yards	Year	Opponent
1	Kalif Phillips	204	2015	Old Dominion
2	Hahsaun Wilson	198	2023	Memphis
3	Kalif Phillips	196	2014	Charleston Southern
4	Kalif Phillips	187	2014	Morehead State
5	Kalif Phillips	183	2016	Southern Miss
6	Benny LeMay	178	2017	FIU
7	Kalif Phillips	173	2014	Wesley
	Benny LeMay	173	2018	FAU
9	Kalif Phillips	168	2014	James Madison
10	Kalif Phillips	164	2014	The Citadel
	Hahsaun Wilson	164	2024	East Carolina

=== Rushing touchdowns ===
Career
Rank	Player	TDs	Years
1	Kalif Phillips	41	2013 2014 2015 2016
2	Benny LeMay	22	2016 2017 2018 2019
3	Hasaan Klugh	19	2016 2017 2018
4	Aaron McAllister	12	2017 2018 2019 2020
	Chris Reynolds	12	2018 2019 2020 2021 2022
6	Hahsaun Wilson	10	2022 2023 2024
7	Calvin Camp	9	2018 2020 2021 2022
8	Shadrick Byrd	7	2021 2022 2023
	Cartevious Norton	7	2024
10	Alan Barnwell	5	2013
	Matt Johnson	5	2013 2014 2015 2016
	Robert Washington	5	2016

Single season
Rank	Player	TDs	Year
1	Kalif Phillips	20	2014
2	Kalif Phillips	12	2013
3	Benny LeMay	11	2018
4	Hasaan Klugh	9	2017
	Benny LeMay	9	2019
6	Hasaan Klugh	8	2016
7	Hahsaun Wilson	7	2024
	Cartevious Norton	7	2024

Single game
Rank	Player	TDs	Year	Opponent
1	Benny LeMay	4	2018	FIU
2	Hahsaun Wilson	3	2023	Memphis
	Calvin Camp	3	2022	Louisiana Tech
	Benny LeMay	3	2019	Appalachian State
	Kalif Phillips	3	2016	Florida Atlantic
	Kalif Phillips	3	2014	Campbell
	Kalif Phillips	3	2014	Johnson C. Smith
	Kalif Phillips	3	2014	Wesley
	Kalif Phillips	3	2014	Morehead State
	Kalif Phillips	3	2013	Morehead State
	Hahsaun Wilson	3	2024	East Carolina

== Receiving ==
=== Receptions ===
Career
Rank	Player	Rec	Years
1	Austin Duke	253	2013 2014 2015 2016
2	Victor Tucker	228	2018 2019 2020 2021 2022
3	Trent Bostick	132	2013 2014 2015 2017
4	Grant DuBose	126	2021 2022
5	Workpeh Kofa	102	2015 2016 2017 2018
6	T.L. Ford	91	2014 2015 2016 2017
7	Elijah Spencer	85	2021 2022
8	Sean Brown	75	2022 2023 2024 2025
9	Cameron Dollar	60	2018 2019 2020 2021
	Javen Nicholas	60	2025

Single season
Rank	Player	Rec	Year
1	Austin Duke	79	2014
2	Grant DuBose	64	2022
3	Austin Duke	62	2013
	Grant DuBose	62	2021
5	Javen Nicholas	60	2025
6	Austin Duke	59	2016
7	Elijah Spencer	57	2022
8	Victor Tucker	54	2018
9	Austin Duke	53	2015
10	Victor Tucker	52	2019

Single game
Rank	Player	Rec	Year	Opponent
1	Austin Duke	12	2014	The Citadel
	Austin Duke	12	2014	Charleston Southern
3	Javen Nicholas	11	2025	North Carolina
4	Victor Tucker	10	2019	North Texas
	Victor Tucker	10	2022	Maryland
	E. Jai Mason	10	2025	Monmouth
7	Victor Tucker	9	2020	Florida Atlantic
	Cameron Dollar	9	2019	UTEP
	Rico Arnold	9	2018	Old Dominion
	Victor Tucker	9	2018	Western Kentucky
	Austin Duke	9	2016	Eastern Michigan
	Austin Duke	9	2015	Presbyterian
	Austin Duke	9	2014	Elon
	Trent Bostick	9	2013	Gardner-Webb
	Austin Duke	9	2013	UNC Pembroke
	Mikel Hunter	9	2013	UNC Pembroke
	Grant DuBose	9	2021	Middle Tennessee
	Grant DuBose	9	2021	Old Dominion
	Grant DuBose	9	2022	Georgia State
	Grant DuBose	9	2022	Middle Tennessee
	Jaden Barnes	9	2026	App State
	Jaden Barnes	9	2026	North Texas

=== Receiving yards ===
Career
Rank	Player	Yards	Years
1	Austin Duke	3,437	2013 2014 2015 2016
2	Victor Tucker	3,066	2018 2019 2020 2021 2022
3	Trent Bostick	1,788	2013 2014 2015 2017
4	Grant DuBose	1,684	2021 2022
5	Elijah Spencer	1,324	2021 2022
6	Workpeh Kofa	1,223	2015 2016 2017 2018
7	T.L. Ford	1,109	2014 2015 2016 2017
8	Sean Brown	1,018	2022 2023 2024 2025
9	Jarius Mack	959	2022 2023 2024
10	Cameron Dollar	883	2018 2019 2020 2021

Single season
Rank	Player	Yards	Year
1	Austin Duke	1,373	2014
2	Elijah Spencer	943	2022
3	Victor Tucker	909	2019
4	Grant DuBose	892	2021
5	Austin Duke	803	2016
6	O'Mega Blake	795	2024
7	Grant DuBose	792	2022
8	Javen Nicholas	740	2025
9	Austin Duke	727	2013
10	Victor Tucker	712	2018

Single game
Rank	Player	Yards	Year	Opponent
1	Austin Duke	254	2014	The Citadel
2	Austin Duke	251	2014	Charleston Southern
3	E. Jai Mason	228	2025	Monmouth
4	O'Mega Blake	205	2024	Florida Atlantic
5	Javen Nicholas	187	2025	North Texas
6	Austin Duke	166	2015	Presbyterian
7	Austin Duke	162	2014	James Madison
8	Elijah Spencer	160	2022	UTEP
9	Cameron Dollar	157	2019	UTEP
10	O'Mega Blake	153	2024	Rice

=== Receiving touchdowns ===
Career
Rank	Player	TDs	Years
1	Austin Duke	24	2013 2014 2015 2016
2	Victor Tucker	19	2018 2019 2020 2021 2022
3	Grant DuBose	15	2021 2022
	Elijah Spencer	15	2021 2022
5	Trent Bostick	12	2013 2014 2015 2017
6	T.L. Ford	10	2014 2015 2016 2017
7	O'Mega Blake	9	2024
8	Cameron Dollar	8	2018 2019 2020 2021
9	C.J. Crawford	6	2013
	Workpeh Kofa	6	2015 2016 2017 2018
	Benny LeMay	6	2016 2017 2018 2019

Single season
Rank	Player	TDs	Year
1	Austin Duke	9	2014
	Grant DuBose	9	2022
	Elijah Spencer	9	2022
	O'Mega Blake	9	2024
5	Victor Tucker	7	2019
6	C.J. Crawford	6	2013
	Austin Duke	6	2013
	Grant DuBose	6	2021
	Elijah Spencer	6	2021
	Victor Tucker	6	2022

Single game
Rank	Player	TDs	Year	Opponent
1	Austin Duke	3	2014	The Citadel
	Austin Duke	3	2015	Florida International
	Elijah Spencer	3	2022	Rice
	O'Mega Blake	3	2024	Florida Atlantic

== Total offense ==
Total offense is the sum of passing and rushing statistics. It does not include receiving or returns.

=== Total offense yards ===
Career
Rank	Player	Yards	Years
1	Chris Reynolds	11,143	2018 2019 2020 2021 2022
2	Matt Johnson	6,682	2013 2014 2015 2016
3	Hasaan Klugh	4,404	2016 2017 2018
4	Kalif Phillips	4,031	2013 2014 2015 2016
5	Benny LeMay	3,232	2016 2017 2018 2019
6	Lee McNeill	1,866	2013 2014 2015
7	Deshawn Purdie	1,672	2024
8	Trexler Ivey	1,603	2022 2023 2024

Single season
Rank	Player	Yards	Year
1	Chris Reynolds	3,355	2019
2	Matt Johnson	2,999	2013
3	Chris Reynolds	2,854	2021
4	Chris Reynolds	2,500	2022
5	Matt Johnson	2,324	2014
6	Hasaan Klugh	2,056	2017
7	Hasaan Klugh	1,782	2016
8	Deshawn Purdie	1,672	2024
9	Benny LeMay	1,525	2018
10	Kalif Phillips	1,441	2014

Single game
Rank	Player	Yards	Year	Opponent
1	Chris Reynolds	449	2021	Louisiana Tech
2	Chris Reynolds	445	2019	UTEP
3	Chris Reynolds	432	2019	North Texas
4	Conner Harrell	429	2025	Monmouth
5	Matt Johnson	419	2013	Gardner-Webb
6	Chris Reynolds	398	2022	Georgia State
7	Deshawn Purdie	392	2024	Florida Atlantic
8	Matt Johnson	385	2014	Charleston Southern

=== Touchdowns responsible for ===
"Touchdowns responsible for" is the NCAA's official term for combined passing and rushing touchdowns.

Career
Rank	Player	TDs	Years
1	Chris Reynolds	96	2018 2019 2020 2021 2022
2	Matt Johnson	47	2013 2014 2015 2016
3	Kalif Phillips	41	2013 2014 2015 2016
	Hasaan Klugh	41	2016 2017 2018
5	Benny LeMay	22	2016 2017 2018 2019
6	Lee McNeill	12	2013 2014 2015 2016
	Aaron McAllister	12	2017 2018 2019 2020
8	Deshawn Purdie	11	2024
	Trexler Ivey	11	2022 2023 2024

Single season
Rank	Player	TDs	Year
1	Chris Reynolds	30	2021
2	Chris Reynolds	28	2019
3	Matt Johnson	24	2013
4	Chris Reynolds	23	2022
5	Kalif Phillips	20	2014
6	Hasaan Klugh	19	2017
7	Hasaan Klugh	18	2016
8	Matt Johnson	14	2014
9	Kalif Phillips	12	2013
10	Benny LeMay	11	2018
	Deshawn Purdie	11	2024

Single game
Rank	Player	TDs	Year	Opponent
1	Matt Johnson	5	2013	Chowan
	Chris Reynolds	5	2021	Middle Tennessee
	Chris Reynolds	5	2022	Georgia State
	Chris Reynolds	5	2022	Rice
	Conner Harrell	5	2025	Monmouth
	Cole Gonzales	5	2026	The Citadel
7	Benny LeMay	4	2018	FIU
	Chris Reynolds	4	2019	North Texas
	Chris Reynolds	4	2019	Appalachian State
	Chris Reynolds	4	2021	Duke
	Chris Reynolds	4	2021	Florida International
	Chris Reynolds	4	2022	UTEP
	Conner Harrell	4	2026	Temple

== Defense ==
=== Interceptions ===
Career
Rank	Player	Ints	Years
1	Terrence Winchester	10	2013 2014 2015 2016
2	Juwan Foggie	7	2015 2016 2017 2018
3	C.J. Cunningham	4	2013 2014
	Ed Rolle	4	2016 2017 2018
	Ben DeLuca	4	2016 2017 2018 2019 2020
6	Desmond Cooper	3	2013 2014
	Tank Norman	3	2013 2014 2015
	Daquan Lucas	3	2015 2016
	Kedrick Davis	3	2016
	Marquill Osborne	3	2019
	Demetrius Knight II	3	2023
	Dontae Balfour	3	2023 2024
	Ja'Qurious Conley	3	2025

Single season
Rank	Player	Ints	Year
1	Juwan Foggie	6	2018
2	Terrence Winchester	4	2015
3	Terrence Winchester	3	2013
	C.J. Cunningham	3	2014
	Kedrick Davis	3	2016
	Ed Rolle	3	2016
	Terrence Winchester	3	2016
	Marquill Osborne	3	2019
	Demetrius Knight II	3	2023
	Ja'Qurious Conley	3	2025

=== Tackles ===
Career
Rank	Player	Tackles	Years
1	Ben DeLuca	312	2016 2017 2018 2019 2020
2	Jeff Gemmell	306	2016 2017 2018 2019
3	Karrington King	267	2014 2015 2016 2017
4	Larry Ogunjobi	217	2013 2014 2015 2016
5	Alex Highsmith	185	2016 2017 2018 2019
6	Reid Williford	184	2022 2023 2024 2025
7	Nick Cook	181	2015 2016
8	Prince Wallace-Bemah	178	2019 2021 2022 2023 2024
9	Markees Watts	177	2018 2019 2020 2021 2022
10	Tyriq Harris	168	2016 2017 2018

Single season
Rank	Player	Tackles	Year
1	Nick Cook	107	2016
2	Jeff Gemmell	106	2017
3	Ben DeLuca	102	2017
4	Marquavis Gibbs	103	2019
5	Demetrius Knight II	96	2023
6	Ben DeLuca	91	2018
7	Jeff Gemmell	87	2018
8	Jeff Gemmell	86	2019
9	Branden Dozier	86	2014
10	Martay Mattox	85	2013

Single game
Rank	Player	Tackles	Year	Opponent
1	Martay Mattox	18	2013	James Madison
2	Ben DeLuca	17	2017	Marshall
	Reid Williford	17	2025	Army
4	Ben DeLuca	16	2017	Florida Atlantic
	Ben DeLuca	16	2020	Appalachian State
6	Dustin Crouser	15	2014	Wesley
	Dustin Crouser	15	2014	Elon
8	Nick Cook	14	2015	Rice
	Ben DeLuca	14	2016	Florida Atlantic
	Jeff Gemmell	14	2017	Eastern Michigan
	Tyler Murray	14	2020	Appalachian State
	Prince Wallace-Bemah	14	2022	Florida International

=== Sacks ===
Career
Rank	Player	Sacks	Years
1	Markees Watts	21.5	2018 2019 2020 2021 2022
2	Alex Highsmith	20.0	2016 2017 2018 2019
3	Larry Ogunjobi	13.0	2013 2014 2015 2016
4	Tyriq Harris	7.0	2016 2017 2018 2020
5	Karrington King	6.5	2014 2015 2016
6	Jeff Gemmell	6.0	2016 2017 2018 2019
	Prince Wallace-Bemah	6.0	2019 2021 2022 2023 2024
	Reid Williford	6.0	2022 2023 2024 2025
9	Amir Siddiq	5.5	2022
	Eyabi Okie-Anoma	5.5	2023

Single season
Rank	Player	Sacks	Year
1	Alex Highsmith	14.0	2019
2	Markees Watts	9.5	2019
3	Markees Watts	6.0	2021
4	Amir Siddiq	5.5	2022
	Eyabi Okie-Anoma	5.5	2023
6	Larry Ogunjobi	5.0	2014
7	Jeff Gemmell	4.0	2018
	Markees Watts	4.0	2022
	Chantz Williams	4.0	2024
	Reid Williford	4.0	2025

Single game
Rank	Player	Sacks	Year	Opponent
1	Alex Highsmith	3.0	2019	Old Dominion
2	Grant DuBose	2.5	2022	Middle Tennessee
3	Mark Hogan	2.0	2013	Morehead State
	Mark Pettit	2.0	2014	Johnson C. Smith
	Karrington King	2.0	2014	Morehead State
	Zach Duncan	2.0	2015	Presbyterian
	Daquan Lucas	2.0	2015	UTSA
	Alex Highsmith	2.0	2019	Gardner-Webb
	Alex Highsmith	2.0	2019	Appalachian State
	Markees Watts	2.0	2021	Florida International
	Eyabi Okie-Anoma	2.0	2023	SMU
	Reid Williford	2.0	2025	Monmouth
	Reid Williford	2.0	2025	North Texas

== Kicking ==
=== Field goals made ===
Career
Rank	Player	FGs	Years
1	Blake Brewer	45	2013 2014 2015 2016
2	Jonathan Cruz	41	2018 2019 2020 2021
3	Kyle Cunanan	14	2023 2024
4	Stephen Rusnak	11	2024
	Liam Boyd	9	2025
6	Steven Muscarello	7	2013 2014 2015 2016
7	Nigel Macauley	3	2017
	Antonio Zita	3	2022
9	Jake Larson	2	2023
10	Jackson Vansickle	1	2017

Single season
Rank	Player	FGs	Year
1	Blake Brewer	18	2014
2	Jonathan Cruz	17	2018
3	Blake Brewer	14	2015
4	Stephen Rusnak	11	2024
5	Jonathan Cruz	10	2019
	Jonathan Cruz	10	2021
7	Blake Brewer	9	2013
	Kyle Cunanan	9	2023
	Liam Boyd	9	2025
10	Steven Muscarello	5	2016
	Kyle Cunanan	5	2024

Single game
Rank	Player	FGs	Year	Opponent
1	Blake Brewer	5	2014	Johnson C. Smith
2	Stephen Rusnak	4	2024	Florida Atlantic
3	Jonathan Cruz	3	2018	Appalachian State
	Blake Brewer	3	2013	Campbell
	Blake Brewer	3	2015	Georgia State
	Kyle Cunanan	3	2023	Florida Atlantic
	Kyle Cunanan	3	2023	Tulsa
	Kyle Cunanan	3	2024	UAB
	Liam Boyd	3	2025	Rice
	Ian Kelly	3	2026	Ole Miss
	Aiden Bui	3	2026	East Carolina

=== Field goal percentage ===
Career (Min. 10 Attempts)
Rank	Player	FG%	Years
1	Stephen Rusnak	100.0%	2024
2	Liam Boyd	75.0%	2025
3	Jonathan Cruz	71.9%	2018 2019 2020 2021
4	Kyle Cunanan	70.0%	2023 2024
5	Blake Brewer	61.6%	2013 2014 2015 2016
6	Nigel Macauley	30.0%	2017

Single season (Min. 10 Attempts)
Rank	Player	FG%	Year
1	Stephen Rusnak	100.0%	2024
2	Jonathan Cruz	77.3%	2018
3	Jonathan Cruz	76.9%	2019
4	Liam Boyd	75.0%	2025
5	Blake Brewer	72.0%	2014
6	Jonathan Cruz	66.7%	2021
7	Blake Brewer	60.0%	2013
	Kyle Cunanan	60.0%	2023
9	Blake Brewer	51.9%	2015
10	Nigel Macauley	30.0%	2017
