= 2014 Charlotte 49ers football team =

American college football season

2014 Charlotte 49ers football
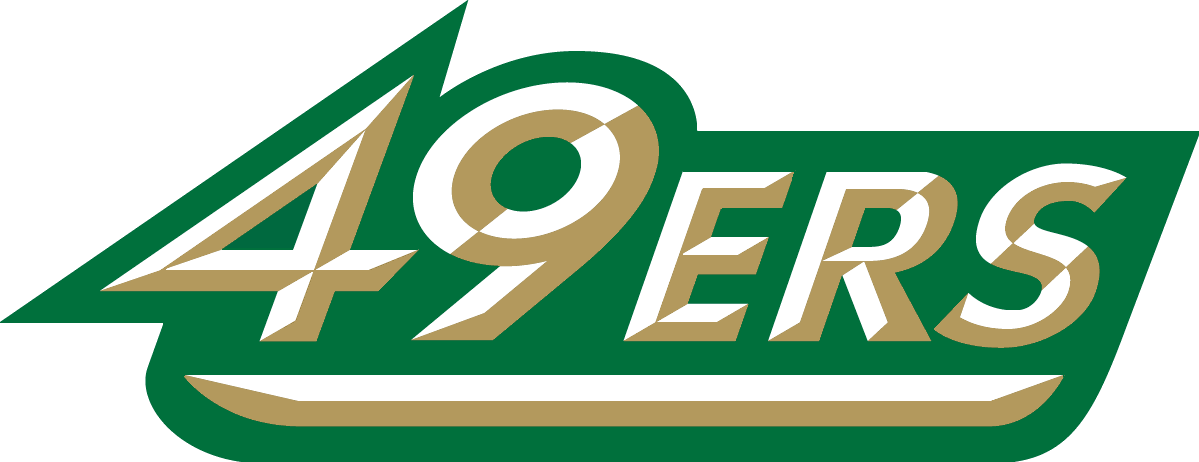
- Conference: Independent
- Record: 5–6
- Head coach: Brad Lambert (2nd season)
- Offensive coordinator: Jeff Mullen (2nd season)
- Offensive scheme: Spread
- Defensive coordinator: Bruce Tall (2nd season)
- Base defense: 3–4
- Home stadium: Jerry Richardson Stadium

2014 NCAA Division I FCS independents football standings
	Conf.			Overall
Team	W		L	W		L
Charlotte		–		5	–	6
Charlotte ineligible for FCS playoffs as part of FBS transition

The 2014 Charlotte 49ers football team represented the University of North Carolina at Charlotte (also called Charlotte or UNC Charlotte) in the 2014 NCAA Division I FCS football season. This was the second season for 49ers football and they were classified as an FCS independent school, meaning they had no athletic conference affiliation for the 2014 season. The team was led by head coach Brad Lambert and played its home games on campus at Jerry Richardson Stadium in Charlotte, North Carolina. As the team was in their two-year transition period before reclassifying to the NCAA Division I Football Bowl Subdivision (FBS), they were ineligible to participate in the FCS playoffs. They finished the season 5–6.

== Personnel ==
=== Coaching staff ===
The coaching staff had no changes from the inaugural season.

Name	Position	Seasons at Charlotte	Alma mater
Brad Lambert	Head coach	2	Kansas State (1987)
Jeff Mullen	Offensive coordinator	2	Wittenberg (1990)
Bruce Tall	Defensive coordinator	2	Ohio Wesleyan
Phil Ratliff	Offensive line/Recruiting coordinator	2	Marshall (1994)
James Adams	Secondary	2	Wake Forest (2006)
Damien Gary	Running backs	2	Georgia (2005)
Johnson Richardson	Tight ends	2	Wofford (2010)
Napoleon Sykes	Outside linebackers	2	Wake Forest (2006)
Joe Tereshinski III	Wide receivers	2	Georgia (2006)

== Recruiting ==
=== Recruiting class ===
The following recruits and transfers have given verbal commitments to the Charlotte 49ers football program for the 2014 recruiting year.

College recruiting (2014)
Name	Hometown	School	Height	Weight	40^{‡}	Commit date
Christian Asher; Athlete	Madison County, VA	Woodberry Forest	6 ft 1 in (1.85 m)	212 lb (96 kg)	-	Sep 4, 2013
Christian Asher; Athlete	Recruit ratings: Rivals:					
Brooks Barden; QB	Cartersville, GA	Cartersville	6 ft 3 in (1.91 m)	200 lb (91 kg)	-	Jul 26, 2013
Brooks Barden; QB	Recruit ratings: Scout: Rivals: ESPN:					
Chris Brown; OG	Charlotte, NC	Zebulon B. Vance	6 ft 4 in (1.93 m)	280 lb (130 kg)	-	Jul 11, 2013
Chris Brown; OG	Recruit ratings: Rivals:					
Jordan Carswell; WR, DB	North Charleston, SC	Stall	6 ft 4 in (1.93 m)	180 lb (82 kg)	4.5	Oct 13, 2013
Jordan Carswell; WR, DB	Recruit ratings: Rivals:					
Jean-Luc Cerza-Lanaux; OL	Charlotte, NC	Charlotte Christian	6 ft 8 in (2.03 m)	280 lb (130 kg)	-	Jul 8, 2013
Jean-Luc Cerza-Lanaux; OL	Recruit ratings: Rivals:					
Nick Cook; OLB	El Dorado, KS	Butler County C.C.	6 ft 3 in (1.91 m)	220 lb (100 kg)	-	Dec 19, 2013
Nick Cook; OLB	Recruit ratings: No ratings found					
Cam Darley; DE	Manning, SC	Manning	6 ft 3 in (1.91 m)	223 lb (101 kg)	4.78	Nov 13, 2013
Cam Darley; DE	Recruit ratings: Rivals:					
Markevis Davis; DB, LB	Asheville, NC	Asheville	6 ft 2 in (1.88 m)	180 lb (82 kg)	-	Oct 1, 2013
Markevis Davis; DB, LB	Recruit ratings: Rivals:					
Nathaniel Davis; OL	Ashburn, VA	Stone Bridge	6 ft 3 in (1.91 m)	275 lb (125 kg)	-	Jun 17, 2013
Nathaniel Davis; OL	Recruit ratings: Rivals:					
Brandon Dozier; S	El Dorado, KS	Butler County C.C.	6 ft 0 in (1.83 m)	203 lb (92 kg)	-	Dec 19, 2013
Brandon Dozier; S	Recruit ratings: No ratings found					
Zach Duncan; DE	Kernersville, NC	East Forsyth	6 ft 3 in (1.91 m)	220 lb (100 kg)	4.8	Nov 13, 2013
Zach Duncan; DE	Recruit ratings: Scout: Rivals:					
Tyler Fain; DT	Chesapeake, VA	Indian River	6 ft 3 in (1.91 m)	255 lb (116 kg)	-	Jan 19, 2014
Tyler Fain; DT	Recruit ratings: Rivals:					
Juwan Foggie; WR	High Point, NC	High Point Central	6 ft 0 in (1.83 m)	206 lb (93 kg)	-	Aug 5, 2013
Juwan Foggie; WR	Recruit ratings: Rivals:					
T.L. Ford; WR	Cartersville, GA	Cartersville	6 ft 3 in (1.91 m)	185 lb (84 kg)	4.62	Jan 14, 2014
T.L. Ford; WR	Recruit ratings: Scout: Rivals: ESPN:					
Arthur Hart; K	Grafton, WI	Grafton	6 ft 2 in (1.88 m)	190 lb (86 kg)	-	Aug 28, 2013
Arthur Hart; K	Recruit ratings: Rivals:					
Denzel Irvin; DB	Winter Garden, FL	Foundation Academy	5 ft 10 in (1.78 m)	165 lb (75 kg)	4.6	Aug 18, 2013
Denzel Irvin; DB	Recruit ratings: Rivals:					
Workpeh Kofa; WR	Charlotte, NC	Independence	6 ft 0 in (1.83 m)	194 lb (88 kg)	-	Jul 25, 2013
Workpeh Kofa; WR	Recruit ratings: Scout: Rivals: ESPN:					
Chris Montgomery; QB	Lawndale, NC	Burns	5 ft 9 in (1.75 m)	158 lb (72 kg)	-	Sep 4, 2013
Chris Montgomery; QB	Recruit ratings: Rivals:					
Richard Murphy; TE	Oroville, CA	Butte C.C.	6 ft 3 in (1.91 m)	240 lb (110 kg)	-	Jan 9, 2014
Richard Murphy; TE	Recruit ratings: No ratings found					
Mark Quattlebaum; WR	Cartersville, GA	Cartersville	5 ft 11 in (1.80 m)	170 lb (77 kg)	-	Aug 5, 2013
Mark Quattlebaum; WR	Recruit ratings: Rivals:					
Maetron Thomas; RB	Stockbridge, GA	Stockbridge	5 ft 8 in (1.73 m)	172 lb (78 kg)	4.45	Aug 2, 2013
Maetron Thomas; RB	Recruit ratings: Scout: Rivals:					
Najee Tucker; S	Mount Ulla Township, Rowan County, North Carolina	West Rowan	6 ft 2 in (1.88 m)	200 lb (91 kg)	4.8	May 22, 2013
Najee Tucker; S	Recruit ratings: Rivals:					
R.J. Tyler; TE	Wagener, SC	Wagener-Salley	6 ft 4 in (1.93 m)	230 lb (100 kg)	-	Jul 2, 2013
R.J. Tyler; TE	Recruit ratings: Rivals:					
Tre'Shun Wynn; DB	Monroe, NC	Monroe	6 ft 0 in (1.83 m)	170 lb (77 kg)	-	Jan 9, 2014
Tre'Shun Wynn; DB	Recruit ratings: Scout: Rivals: ESPN:					
Overall recruit ranking:
Note: In many cases, Scout, Rivals, 247Sports, On3, and ESPN may conflict in their listings of height and weight.; In these cases, the average was taken. ESPN grades are on a 100-point scale.; Sources: "2014 Team Ranking". Rivals.com.

== Players ==
=== Player gameday honors ===
Wearing Jersey #49	Position	Game	Game Captains	Flag Carriers
Jamal Covington	OL	Campbell	Desmond Cooper, Daniel Blitch, Demarjai Devine, Caleb Clayton-Mobly	Nick Cook, Austin Duke, Jordan Abrams
Jarred Barr	OL	Johnson C. Smith	Daniel Blitch, Mark Montini, Tyler DeStefani, Caleb Clayton-Mobly	Justin Bolus, Cortezz Nixon, Terrance Winchester
Caleb Clayton-Mobly	LB	NC Central	Danny Book, Peter Fields, Desmond Cooper, Branden Dozier	Jalen Holt, Stephen Muscarello, Trent Bostick
Daniel Book	OL	Elon	Desmond Cooper, Brandon Banks, Jamal Covington, Daniel Blitch	Casey Perry, Tank Norman, Austin Duke
Brandon Banks	DE	Charleston Southern	Desmond Cooper, Daniel Blitch, Demarjai Devine, Tyler DeStefani	Austin Duke, Dustin Crouser, Blake Brewer
Thomas LaBianca	C	Gardner-Webb	Daniel Blitch, Austin Duke, Tyler DeStefani, Larry Ogunjobi	Kaliff Phillips, Nico Alcalde, Karrington King
Larry Ogunjobi	NT	The Citadel	Tyler DeStefani, Branden Dozier, Dmarjai Devine, Danny Book	Jordan Starnes, Mark Montini, Dustin Crouser
Mark Montini	H	James Madison	Daniel Blitch, Tyler DeStefani, Trent Bostick, Larry Ogunjob	Richard Murphy, Karrington King, Kyle Hoffman
Trent Bostick	WR	Coastal Carolina	Daniel Blitch, Dmarjai Devine, Desmond Cooper, Branden Dozier	Jamal Covington, Nico Alcalde, EJ Rhinehart
Kalif Phillips	RB	Wesley	Austin Duke, Trent Bostick, Branden Dozier, Larry Ogunjobi	Jamal Covington, Devin Clegg, Damarrell Alexander
Austin Duke	WR	Morehead State	Daniel Blitch, Desmond Cooper, Tyler DeStefani, Dmarjai Devine, Peter Fields, Quintin Gay, Mark Montini	TL Ford, Daquan Lucas, Juwan Foggie

=== Players ===
2014 Charlotte 49ers football team roster
Players
Coaches
Offense

Pos.	#	Name	Class
WR	2	Will Thomas	RSo
RB	3	Kalif Phillips	So
WR	4	Corey Nesmith Jr. (injured)	RSo
QB	5	Lee McNeill	RSo
QB	8	Matt Johnson (injured)	RSo
WR	9	Demarjai Devine	Sr
SR	10	Austin Duke	RSo
WR	11	Emmitt Afam	So
QB	12	Brooks Barden	Fr
H-Back	15	Justin Bolus	RSo
SR	16	Mark Quattlebaum	Fr
H-Back	17	Joc Watkins	RFr
SR	18	Chris Montgomery	Fr
QB	19	Austin Pires	Fr
RB	22	Donjore Gainey	RSo
RB	23	Maetron Thomas	Fr
WR	29	Uriah LeMay	RFr
RB	30	Quintin Gay	RSr
RB	32	Damarrell Alexander	RJr
H-Back	33	Garrison Duncan	So
H-Back	44	Colby Qwens	Fr
OL	45	Christian Asher	Fr
H-Back	47	Mark Montini	RSr
G	50	Jarred Barr	RSo
OL	51	Zach Bumgarner	RSo
OL	53	Eric Herkley	RSo
C	55	Mason Sledge	RSo
OL	60	Chris Brown	Fr
OL	61	Zach Thomas	RJr
OL	63	Cameron Curlings	RSo
OL	64	Nate Davis	Fr
OL	66	Joe Wolljung	RSo
OL	67	Mitch Monska	RFr
OL	68	Daniel Book	RJr
OT	70	Casey Perry	RSo
OL	71	Jean Luc Cerza-Lanaux	Fr
G	72	Tevin Lawshe	RFr
OT	73	Jamal Covington	RSo
G	74	Thomas LaBianca	RSo
OT	75	Eugene German	RFr
OT	76	Daniel Blitch	RSr
OT	77	Wolfgang Zacherl	So
OT	78	Kyle Hoffman	RSo
OT	79	Jeff Walker	RFr
WR	80	Reggie Woods	RFr
WR	81	Trent Bostick	So
H-Back	82	Jason Eury	RSo
WR	83	Workpeh Kofa	Fr
WR	84	Juwan Foggie	Fr
H-Back	85	Richard Murphy	Jr
WR	87	E.J. Rhinehart	RSo
H-Back	88	R.J. Tyler	Fr
WR	89	T.L. Ford	Fr
H-Back	90	Peter Fields	RJr

Defense

Pos.	#	Name	Class
DB	3	Branden Dozier	Jr
DB	5	Tre'Shun Wynn	Fr
LB	6	Nick Cook (injured)	Jr
LB	7	Jalen Holt	RSo
CB	8	Ardy Holmes	RJr
LB	11	Mark Pettit	RSo
FS	13	Desmond Cooper	RSr
DE	14	Tank Norman	RSo
CB	19	Devin Pearson	So
DB	20	Najee Tucker	Fr
FS	21	Prince Mayela	RSo
FS	24	Daquan Lucas	RSo
CB	26	Cortezz Nixon	RJr
CB	27	Terrance Winchester	RSo
DE	28	Greg Cunningham Jr.	RSo
DB	31	Markevis Davis	Fr
LB	34	Nico Alcalde	RSo
LB	35	Nick Vagnone	Fr
SS	36	Nick Halmon	RFr
DB	38	Connor Dulmage	Fr
DB	39	Anthony Covington	So
FS	41	Jordan Abrams	RSo
LB	42	Caleb Clayton-Mobly (injured)	Sr
LB	43	Tyler DeStefani	RSr
LB	46	DaQuavius Reid	RSo
DE	50	Karrington King	RFr
DE	52	Zach Duncan	Fr
LB	54	Jordan Starnes	RFr
DE	56	Cam Darley	Fr
LB	57	Justin Bridges-Thompson	So
LB	58	Dustin Crouser	RFr
DE	59	Payton Thomson	RSo
DE	62	Tyler Fain	Fr
NT	65	Larry Ogunjobi	RSo
DE	91	Nick Carroll	RFr
DE	92	James Middleton	RSo
NT	93	Hayden Beck	RSo
DE	94	Josh Manley	RSo
DE	95	Devin Clegg	RSo
DE	96	Devon Johnson	Sr
NT	97	Tanner Flemming	RSo
DE	98	Westom Smith	RSo
DE	99	Brandon Banks	RSo

Special teams

Pos.	#	Name	Class
K	37	Hayden Pezzoni	RSo
P	40	Arthur Hart	Fr
LS	48	Keaston Sinicki	So
LS	64	Brian McDonough	Fr
K	69	Stephen Muscarello	RSo
K	86	Blake Brewer	So

Head coach

- Brad Lambert (Kansas State)

Coordinators/assistant coaches

- Jeff Mullen (Wittenberg)
  Offensive coordinator/quarterbacks
- Bruce Tall (Ohio Wesleyan)
  Defensive coordinator
- Phil Ratliff (Marshall)
  Recruiting coordinator/offensive line
- Damien Gary (Georgia)
  Running backs
- Johnson Richardson (Wofford)
  Tight ends
- Joe Tereshinski III (Georgia)
  Wide receivers
- James Adams (Wake Forest)
  Secondary
- Napoleon Sykes (Wake Forest)
  Outside linebackers

Legend

- (C) Team captain
- (S) Suspended
- (I) Ineligible
- Injured
- Redshirt

Roster
Last update: April 12, 2015

=== Depth chart ===
Defense

FS
DESMOND COOPER
Prince Mayela
⋅

WLB	ILB	ILB	SLB
NICO ALCALDE	NICK COOK	CALEB CLAYTON-MOLBY	JALEN HOLT
Daquan Lucas	Karrington King	Dustin Crouser	Tyler DeStefani
⋅	⋅	⋅	⋅

SS
BRANDEN DOZIER
Ardy Holmes
⋅

CB
TANK NORMAN
Tre'Shun Wynn
⋅

DE	NT	DE
BRANDON BANKS	LARRY OGUNJOBI	JAMES MIDDLETON
Mark Pettit	Tanner Fleming	Nick Carroll
⋅	⋅	Devin Clegg

CB
GREG CUNNINGHAM JR.
Terrance Winchester
⋅

Offense

WR
DMARJAI DEVINE
Juwan Foggie
⋅

WR
AUSTIN DUKE
Will Thomas
⋅

LT	LG	C	RG	RT
JAMAL COVINGTON	CASEY PERRY	THOMAS LA BIANCA	DANIEL BLITCH	DANNY BOOK
Kyle Hoffman	Wolfgang Zacherl	Jarred Barr	Mason Sledge	Eugene German
⋅	⋅	⋅	⋅	⋅

WR
JUSTIN BOLUS
Richard Murphy
⋅

WR
TRENT BOSTICK
T.L. Ford
⋅

QB
MATT JOHNSON
Lee McNeill
⋅

RB
KALIF PHILLIPS
Damarrell Alexander
⋅

Special teams
PK BLAKE BREWER
PK Stephen Muscarello
P ARTHUR HART
P Hayden Pezzoni
KR AUSTIN DUKE
PR COREY NESMITH
LS KEASTON SINICKI
H LEE MCNEILL

== Schedule ==
Date	Time	Opponent	Site	TV	Result	Attendance
August 28	7:00 pm	at Campbell	Barker–Lane Stadium; Buies Creek, NC		W 33–9	6,472
September 6	12:00 pm	Johnson C. Smith	Jerry Richardson Stadium; Charlotte, NC	ASN	W 56–0	15,875
September 13	5:00 pm	at North Carolina Central	O'Kelly–Riddick Stadium; Durham, NC		W 40–28	4,006
September 20	7:00 pm	at Elon	Rhodes Stadium; Elon, NC	ASN	L 13–20	11,203
September 27	12:00 pm	No. 25 Charleston Southern	Jerry Richardson Stadium; Charlotte, NC	WCCB	L 41–47 ^{OT}	14,498
October 4	1:30 pm	at Gardner–Webb	Ernest W. Spangler Stadium; Boiling Springs, NC	ESPN3	L 24–27	7,892
October 11	2:00 pm	at The Citadel	Johnson Hagood Stadium; Charleston, SC		L 56–63 ^{2OT}	10,467
October 25	12:00 pm	James Madison^{†}	Jerry Richardson Stadium; Charlotte, NC	WCCB	L 40–48	15,677
November 8	12:00 pm	No. 2 Coastal Carolina	Jerry Richardson Stadium; Charlotte, NC	WCCB	L 34–59	12,052
November 15	12:00 pm	No. 4 (D-III) Wesley	Jerry Richardson Stadium; Charlotte, NC	ASN	W 38–33	10,704
November 22	12:00 pm	Morehead State	Jerry Richardson Stadium; Charlotte, NC	WCCB	W 52–14	10,826
^{†}Homecoming; Rankings from Coaches' Poll released prior to the game; All times are in Eastern time

== Television ==
Local TV coverage continued on WCCB with Sam Smith calling play-by-play. Former Carolina Panther Quarterback Brett Basanez and Jeff Zell with color commentary; and Brandon Davidow from the sideline.

== Radio ==
Radio coverage for all games was broadcast by IMG College through the Charlotte 49ers Radio Network flagship station WFNZ 610 am The Fan. The radio announcers are Matt Swierad with play-by-play, former Carolina Panther Kevin Donnalley with color commentary, and Bobby Rosinski with sideline reports.

== Game summaries ==
=== Campbell Fighting Camels ===
Campbell vs. Charlotte

Team	1	2	3	4	Total
• 49ers	6	0	21	6	33
Fighting Camels	0	3	0	6	9

- Date: August 28
- Location: Barker-Lane Stadium
  Buies Creek, NC
- Game start: 7:00 pm EDT
- Elapsed time: 3:19
- Game attendance: 6,472
- Game weather: 91 °F (33 °C), Clear, 3 mph (4.8 km/h)
- Referee: Kelvin Thorpe

Scoring summary
1	07:10	CHAR	Blake BREWER 50 yd field goal	CHAR 3-0
1	00:08	CHAR	Blake BREWER 38 yd field goal	CHAR 6-0
2	00:03	CAMP	Mitchell BROWN 25 yd field goal	CHAR 6-3
3	07:55	CHAR	Kalif PHILLIPS 1 yd run (Blake BREWER kick)	CHAR 13-3
3	04:20	CHAR	Kalif PHILLIPS 1 yd run (Blake BREWER kick)	CHAR 20-3
3	03:00	CHAR	Kalif PHILLIPS 10 yd run (Blake BREWER kick)	CHAR 27-3
4	14:55	CAMP	Ben BOLLING 25 yd pass from Dakota WOLF (Dakota WOLF pass failed)	CHAR 27-9
4	12:29	CHAR	Maetron THOMAS 40 yd run (Lee MCNEILL rush failed)	CHAR 33-9

In this rematch the Campbell Fighting Camels were looking for revenge against the Charlotte 49ers for their 52 to 7 loss in the 49ers' debut game the previous year, but the 49ers would prevail again in the return game.

The game began slowly for both teams as Charlotte would score first midway through the first quarter on a 50-yard Blake Brewer field goal. This set the new distance record for field goals at Lane-Barker Stadium. Blake Brewer would connect on a 38-yard field goal at the end of the first quarter to give the 49ers a 6 to 0 lead heading to the second quarter.

The second quarter would be another low-scoring affair, with the Camels getting on the board at the close of the half on a Mitchell Brown 25-yard field goal. The score at halftime was 49ers 6, Fighting Camels 3.

The second half of scoring would start as slow as the first half, but a Kalif Phillips 1-yard rushing touchdown would be the first of three touchdowns for both him and the 49ers in the third quarter. Another 1-yard rushing touchdown was followed on the next series for the 49ers by a 10-yard rushing touchdown, both by Phillips, that would put the 49ers ahead heading into the 4th quarter by a score 27 to 3.

The Camels would get into scoring position at the end of the third quarter; but would score their only touchdown of the day on the first play of the fourth quarter on a 25-yard pass from Dakota Wolf to Ben Bolling, the subsequent 2-point conversion attempt would fail. Charlotte would tack on 6 more points on the next drive with true Freshman running back Meatron Thomas's first collegiate touchdown, a 40-yard rush; but the 2-point conversion attempt would fail. Charlotte won the game by a score of 33 to 9.

Top performers for the game include Campbell Quarterback Dakota Wolf, who passed for 187 yards and 1 touchdown. Charlotte Running Back Kalif Phillips had 13 carries for 70 yards and 3 touchdowns. Campbell Receiver Ben Bolling had 6 receptions for 71 yards and a touchdown. The announced attendance of 6,472 set a new record for Lane-Barker Stadium.

Game Notes:

- Blake Brewer sets school-record with his 50-yard field goal.
- First away game in the State of North Carolina.

=== Johnson C. Smith Golden Bulls ===
J.C. Smith vs. Charlotte

Team	1	2	3	4	Total
Golden Bulls	0	0	0	0	0
• 49ers	23	13	13	7	56

- Date: September 6
- Location: Jerry Richardson Stadium
  Charlotte, NC
- Game start: 12:04 pm EDT
- Elapsed time: 3:09
- Game attendance: 15,875
- Game weather: 85 °F (29 °C), Scattered Clouds, 0 mph (0 km/h)
- Referee: Joe Pester
- TV announcers (ASN, WCCB): Mike Gleason, Jim Donnan

Scoring summary
1	13:17	CHAR	Kalif PHILLIPS 6 yd run (Blake BREWER rush failed)	CHAR 6-0
1	10:20	CHAR	T.L. FORD 24 yd pass from Matt JOHNSON (Blake BREWER kick)	CHAR 13-0
1	6:01	CHAR	Blake BREWER 26 yd field goal	CHAR 16-0
1	2:32	CHAR	Kalif PHILLIPS 4 yd run (Blake BREWER kick)	CHAR 23-0
2	12:32	CHAR	Kalif PHILLIPS 6 yd run (Blake BREWER kick)	CHAR 30-0
2	6:39	CHAR	Stephen MUSCARELLO 22 yd field goal	CHAR 33-0
2	0:00	CHAR	Blake BREWER 17 yd field goal	CHAR 36-0
3	13:01	CHAR	Prince MAYELA 48 yd interception return (Blake BREWER kick)	CHAR 43-0
3	8:05	CHAR	Blake BREWER 27 yd field goal	CHAR 46-0
3	3:31	CHAR	Stephen MUSCARELLO 22 yd field goal	CHAR 49-0
4	14:07	CHAR	Maetron THOMAS 60 yd run (Blake BREWER kick)	CHAR 56-0

The "Battle of the Queen City" commenced as these cross-town universities faced each other on the gridiron for the first and likely only time.

Charlotte would score early and often, especially in the first quarter when running back Kalif Phillips would punch it in from 6 yards out to get the scoring started. On the next series for the Niners true Freshman T.L. Ford would get his first collegiate touchdown on a 24-yard pass from quarterback Matt Johnson. Kicker Blake Brewer would add 3 more points with a 26-yard field goal. Then Kalif Phillips would add another 6 points to end the quarter with a 4-yard rushing touchdown. The score heading to the second quarter was 49ers 23, Golden Bulls 0.

Kalif Phillips would tack on his third rushing touchdown early in the second quarter on another 6-yard run. This would tie the team record for single game rushing touchdowns set by Phillips in the final game of the previous season at Morehead State, and matched by him in the season opener at Campbell the week before; making this Phillips' third consecutive 3 rushing touchdown game. Kicker Stephen Muscarello would tack on 3 more points with a 22-yard field goal. With no time left on the clock Blake Brewer would complete the next field goal for the 49ers from 17 yards out to make the halftime score Charlotte 36, Johnson C. Smith 0.

The second half scoring would commence when J.C. Smith quarterback Keahn Wallace would have a pass intercepted by Charlotte free safety Prince Mayela which he took back for a defensive touchdown. Midway through the third quarter Blake Brewer added a 27-yard field goal, and then late in the quarter Stephen Muscarello would add a 22-yard field goal. The game would head to the final quarter with the score 49ers 49, Golden Bulls 0.

Charlotte true Freshmen running back Maetron Thomas would break free for a 60-yard rushing touchdown on the second play of the fourth quarter. On their first series of the quarter the Golden Bulls would get into scoring position to threaten Charlotte's first potential shutout game, but the Eric Amaya field goal attempt from 26 yards out would be blocked by Charlotte linebacker DaQuavius Reid and the ball would be recovered for the 49ers cornerback Cortezz Nixon to preserve the shutout. The game would end with the first shutout in Charlotte program history and a final score of 49ers 56, Golden Bulls 0.

Top performers for the game include Charlotte Quarterback Matt Johnson, who passed for 285 yards and a touchdown. Charlotte Running Back Kalif Phillips had 10 carries for 41 yards and 3 touchdowns. Charlotte Receiver Trent Bostick had 4 receptions for 92 yards.

Game Notes:

- Charlotte 49ers first-ever shutout game.

=== NCCU Eagles ===
N.C. Central vs. Charlotte

Team	1	2	3	4	Total
• 49ers	13	20	7	0	40
Eagles	0	0	0	28	28

- Date: September 13
- Location: O'Kelly–Riddick Stadium
  Durham, NC
- Game start: 5:00 pm EDT
- Elapsed time: 3:19
- Game attendance: 4006
- Game weather: 75 °F (24 °C), Cloudy, 3 mph (4.8 km/h)
- Referee: Kelvin Thorpe

Scoring summary
1	14:43	CHAR	Austin DUKE 65 yd pass from Matt JOHNSON (Blake BREWER kick)	CHAR 7-0
1	10:50	CHAR	Blake BREWER 24 yd field goal	CHAR 10-0
1	0:06	CHAR	Blake BREWER 28 yd field goal	CHAR 13-0
2	11:46	CHAR	Kalif PHILLIPS 2 yd run (Blake BREWER kick)	CHAR 20-0
2	8:09	CHAR	Kalif PHILLIPS 4 yd run (Blake BREWER rush fumbled)	CHAR 26-0
2	2:08	CHAR	Branden DOZIER 52 yd fumble recovery (Blake BREWER kick)	CHAR 33-0
3	3:10	CHAR	Maetron THOMAS 6 yd run (Blake BREWER kick)	CHAR 40-0
4	14:53	NCCU	Adrian WILKINS 28 yd pass from Malcolm BELL (Brandon McLAREN kick)	CHAR 40-7
4	11:56	NCCU	Jeremy THOMPSON 26 yd interception return (Brandon McLAREN kick)	CHAR 40-14
4	9:17	NCCU	Jvon SIMMONS 15 yd pass from Malcolm BELL (Brandon McLAREN kick)	CHAR 40-21
4	3:54	NCCU	Andre CLARKE 4 yd run (Brandon McLAREN kick)	CHAR 40-28

The 49ers were looking for revenge for the program's first ever loss the year before in Charlotte. They would return the favor in Durham, but not before surviving a fourth quarter scoring flurry by the Eagles.

On the first play from scrimmage 49ers' quarterback Matt Johnson would complete a 65-yard touchdown pass to wide receiver Austin Duke to give the Niners an early lead. On their next series the Niners would get kicker Blake Brewer in range for a 24-yard field goal. At the end of the quarter Brewer would add another field goal, this time from 28 yards, to take the Niners into the second quarter with a 13 to 0 lead.

Charlotte running back Kalif Phillips would score his first touchdown of the day and the quarter with a 2-yard rush on Charlotte's first second quarter series. On the 49ers' next series Phillips would punch it in from 4 yards out, but a muffed snap would cost the Niners the extra point. Late in the half Eagles' quarterback Malcolm Bell, who had substituted in for starter Quinn Billerman a few series earlier, would complete a 24-yard pass to Anas Hasic, but 49ers safety Desmond Cooper would force Hasic to fumble. The ball was then recovered by 49ers's defensive back Branden Dozier and returned 52 yards for a touchdown. The 49ers would head into the locker room at the half with a 33 to 0 lead.

On the 49ers' second series of the second half, running back Maetron Thomas would get the 49ers their final score of the game on 6-yard touchdown run. The score heading into the fourth quarter would be 49ers 40, Eagles 0.

On the first play of the fourth quarter, the Eagles would finally get on the board with a 28-yard touchdown pass from Malcolm Bell to Adrian Wilkins. On the next series, 49ers' quarterback Lee McNeill would throw an interception to the Eagle's Jeremy Thompson, who would return it 26 yards for another Eagles' touchdown. Three plays into the Eagle's next series would result in a Malcolm Bell 15-yard touchdown pass to Jvon Simmons. On their next series, the 49ers would get into scoring range on a Matt Johnson 70 yard rush; but after the Niners were unable to convert another first down, Blake Brewer would miss a 24-yard field goal. On the next series the Eagles' Andre Clarke would score the Eagle's fourth touchdown of the quarter from 4 yards out. Charlotte would go 3-and-out on their next possession and return the ball to the Eagles, but on their next play Malcolm Bell's pass attempt would fall into the hands of the 49ers' defensive end Tank Norman. Despite the four-touchdown fourth-quarter effort from Central, the 49ers would hang onto the lead to complete the revenge game with the final score of 40 to 28.

Top performers for the game include N.C. Central quarterback Malcolm Bell, who passed for 337 yards and two touchdowns with one interception. Charlotte running back Kalif Phillips had 14 carries for 104 yards and 2 touchdowns. N.C. Central receiver Adrian Wilkins had 7 receptions for 129 yards and a touchdown.

Game notes:

- First time the 49ers have scored on 1st play from scrimmage.
- School-record three straight wins.

=== Elon Phoenix ===
Elon vs. Charlotte

Team	1	2	3	4	Total
49ers	7	0	3	3	13
• Phoenix	0	7	6	7	20

- Date: September 20
- Location: Rhodes Stadium
  Elon, NC
- Game start: 7:04 pm EDT
- Elapsed time: 3:40
- Game attendance: 11,203
- Game weather: 77 °F (25 °C), Partly Cloudy, 6 mph (9.7 km/h)
- Referee: Matt Overton
- TV announcers (ASN): Mike Gleason; Michael Young

Scoring summary
1	10:17	CHAR	Austin DUKE 19 yd pass from Matt JOHNSON (Blake BREWER kick)	CHAR 7-0
2	12:26	ELON	Kierre BROWN 14 yd pass from Mike QUINN (John GALLAGHAR kick)	TIED 7-7
3	11:49	ELON	John GALLAGHAR 24 yd field goal	ELON 10-7
3	8:34	CHAR	Blake BREWER 27 yd field goal	TIED 10-10
3	5:00	ELON	John GALLAGHAR 26 yd field goal	ELON 13-10
4	11:17	CHAR	Blake BREWER 43 yd field goal	TIED 13-13
4	3:57	ELON	Kierre BROWN 5 yd pass from Mike QUINN (John GALLAGHAR kick)	ELON 20-13

The 49ers would face their second ever CAA opponent as they traveled to nearby Elon to tackle the Phoenix.

Elon would get into scoring position first in the game on their first series, but John Gallagher's 50-yard field goal attempt would fail. On the very next drive, Charlotte's Matt Johnson would connect on a 19-yard touchdown pass to Austin Duke. The 49ers would head to the second quarter up 7 to 0.

The Phoenix would get on the board on their first drive of the second quarter on a Mike Quinn 14-yard touchdown pass to Kierre Brown to tie the score at 7 all. This would prove to be the only score of the quarter as both teams headed into halftime tied.

Elon would score first in the second half, capping their first drive with a John Gallaghar 24-yard field goal and taking their first lead of the game. The 49ers would march down the field on the very next series and tie the score on a Blake Brewer 27-yard field goal. The Phoenix would again get Gallaghar into range and retake the lead on a 26-yard field goal. Elon would get back into field goal range late in the third quarter, but Gallaghar would miss his second field goal of the day from 42 yards out. The score headed to the fourth quarter was Elon up 13 to 10.

The Phoenix would get into field goal range yet again on the first drive of the fourth quarter, but Gallaghar would miss his third field goal of the day, this time from 49 yards away. On the 49ers next drive Blake Brewer would split the uprights from 43 yards away to tie the game at 13 all. Midway through the quarter Elon would cap a long drive with their second touchdown of the day on a 5-yard pass; another Mike Quinn connection to Kierre Brown. The Niners would get into Elon territory on their next drive but Matt Johnson's pass attempt on 2nd down would be intercepted by Elon's Odell Benton. Charlotte would get the ball back with a little over a minute left in the game. The Niners would get to Elon's 22-yard line but an incomplete pass would be followed by a scrambling throw from Johnson to Corey Nesmith in the endzone corner for an apparent touchdown; but two penalties were called on the play against Charlotte. A holding call would be declined in favor of an illegal forward pass as Johnson had stepped over the line of scrimmage. With no time left on the clock and the penalty also carrying a loss of down, Elon would hold out and give the 49ers their first loss of the season, 20 to 13.

Charlotte Receiver Austin Duke would become the first player in program history to gain over 1,000 yards for his career in the first half. Charlotte Running back Kalif Phillips would become the program's first rusher to also get over 1,000 yards during the second half.

Top performers for the game include Elon Quarterback Mike Quinn, who passed for 331 yards and 2 touchdowns with 1 interception. Elon Running Back B.J. Bennett had 18 carries for 83 yards. Elon Receiver Kierre Brown had 13 receptions for 81 yards and 2 touchdowns.

Game Notes:

- Austin Duke becomes the first 1000-yard receiver, career.
- Kalif Phillips becomes first 1000-yard rusher, career.

=== #25 Charleston Southern Buccaneers ===
Charleston Southern vs. Charlotte

Team	1	2	3	4	OT	Total
• #25 Buccaneers	21	7	6	7	6	47
49ers	7	10	10	14	0	41

- Date: September 27
- Location: Jerry Richardson Stadium
  Charlotte, NC
- Game start: 12:04 pm EDT
- Elapsed time: 3:23
- Game attendance: 14,498
- Game weather: 72 °F (22 °C), Scattered Clouds, 5 mph (8.0 km/h)
- Referee: Steve Barth
- TV announcers (WCCB): Sam Smith, Brett Basanez, Jeff Zell, & Brandon Davidow

Scoring summary
1	9:35	CHSO	Christian REYES 11 yd pass from Austin BROWN (David KENNEDY Kick)	CHSO 7-0
1	9:00	CHAR	Austin DUKE 74 yd pass from Matt JOHNSON (Blake BREWER Kick)	TIED 7-7
1	2:50	CHSO	Mike HOLLOWAY 21 yd pass from Daniel CROGHAN III (David KENNEDY Kick)	CHSO 14-7
1	0:13	CHSO	Christian REYES 45 yd Run (David KENNEDY Kick)	CHSO 21-7
2	14:48	CHAR	Kalif PHILLIPS 77 yd Run (Blake BREWER Kick)	CHSO 21-14
2	5:12	CHSO	Daniel CROGHAN III 3 yd Run (David KENNEDY Kick)	CHSO 28-14
2	2:53	CHAR	Blake BREWER 36 yd Field Goal	CHSO 28-17
3	8:43	CHSO	Christian REYES 4 yd Run (David KENNEDY PAT failed)	CHSO 34-17
3	6:10	CHAR	Matt JOHNSON 23 yd Run (Blake BREWER Kick)	CHSO 34-24
3	0:05	CHAR	Blake BREWER 25 yd Field Goal	CHSO 34-27
4	12:33	CHAR	Austin DUKE 61 yd pass from Matt JOHNSON (Blake BREWER Kick)	TIED 34-34
4	3:53	CHSO	Nathan PERERA 5 yd pass from Austin BROWN (David KENNEDY Kick)	CHSO 41-34
4	2:19	CHAR	Kalif PHILLIPS 34 yd Run (Blake BREWER Kick)	TIED 41-41
OT	0:00	CHSO	Christian REYES 1 yd Run	CHSO 47-41

The 49ers were looking for revenge against their first ranked opponent of the year, the Charleston Southern Buccaneers.

The Bucs would score first on their second series of the game. An 11-yard touchdown pass from Austin Brown to Christian Reyes. Charlotte would tie the score two players later off a Matt Johnson 74-yard pass to Austin Duke. Later in the quarter Daniel Croghan would step in for Brown and complete a 21-yard touchdown pass to Mike Holloway to retake the lead for the Bucs. The Bucs would tack on another touchdown near the end of the quarter off a Christian Reyes 45 yard rush. The first half would end with Charleston Southern up 21 to 7 on the 49ers.

On the first play of the second quarter Charlotte rusher Kalif Phillips would break off a 77-yard touchdown run. Halfway through the quarter Bucs quarterback Daniel Crohgan would stretch Charleston Southern's lead with a 3-yard touchdown run. On the next series Charlotte would get kicker Blake Brewer in range to make his first field goal of the day from 36 yards out. Both teams would head in at the half with the score Charleston Southern 28, Charlotte 17.

To start the second half the Bucs would string together a 12 play drive that would be capped by another Christian Reyes 4-yard touchdown rush. On the next series 49er Matt Johnson would get a 23-yard rushing touchdown. On their next possession Charlotte would get another Blake Brewer field goal, this time from 25 yards. The score at the end of the third quarter would be Bucs up on the 49ers, 34 to 27.

On their second play of the fourth quarter, Matt Johnson would connect on another long passing touchdown to Austin Duke for 61 yards and to tie the game again. On the next series Charleston Southern would cap a 15 play, clock-eating drive, with an Austin Brown 5-yard touchdown pass to Nathan Perera to regain the lead. The 49ers would tie it again on the next series on a Kalif Phillips 34-yard rushing touchdown. On the final drive of regulation the Bucs would get it to the 49ers' 21 yard line and run the clock down for a game-winning field goal attempt, but David Kennedy's 38-yard attempt would fail. The teams headed into overtime tied up at 41.

The Niners would get the ball first in the program's first ever overtime period. The Niners would quickly get it to the Bucs 8 yard line, but a false start call would back them up. Matt Johnson would rush the ball to the 1-yard line, but a holding call would negate the run. The 49ers would have to settle for a field goal, but Blake Brewer's 30-yard kick would sail left. Charleston Southern would then get their turn and would win the game on another Christian Reyes rushing touchdown, this time from 1 yard out. The final score in overtime was Charleston Southern 47, Charlotte 49ers 41.

Despite the loss, the top performers for the game were all on the home team. Matt Johnson passed for 305 yards, 2 touchdowns and 2 Interceptions. Kalif Phillips would have 21 carries for 196 yards and 2 touchdowns. Austin Duke would have 12 receptions for 251 yards and 2 touchdowns.

Game Notes:

- First overtime game in program history.
- Austin Duke sets school record with 251 yards receiving.
- Duke sets school record for longest touchdown play, 74 yards.
- Kalif Phillips sets school record with 196 yds rushing.

=== Gardner–Webb Runnin' Bulldogs ===
Gardner–Webb vs. Charlotte

Team	1	2	3	4	Total
49ers	10	7	0	7	24
• Runnin' Bulldogs	14	3	0	10	27

- Date: October 4
- Location: Ernest W. Spangler Stadium
  Boiling Springs, NC
- Game start: 1:34 pm EDT
- Elapsed time: 2:44
- Game attendance: 7,892
- Game weather: 60 °F (16 °C), Sunny, 17 mph (27 km/h) WNW
- Referee: Riley Johnson
- TV announcers (ESPN3): Mike Hogewood, Renaldo Wynn

Scoring summary
1	10:23	CHAR	Blake BREWER 25 yd Field Goal	CHAR 3-0
1	10:09	GWU	J.J. HUBBARD 95 yd Kickoff Return (Grayson GREGORY Kick)	GWU 7-3
1	6:37	GWU	Juanne BLOUNT 21 yd Run (Grayson GREGORY Kick)	GWU 14-3
1	0:11	CHAR	Demarjai DEVINE 59 yd pass from Matt JOHNSON (Blake BREWER Kick)	GWU 14-10
2	3:59	CHAR	Branden DOZIER 39 yd Interception Return (Blake BREWER Kick)	CHAR 17-14
2	0:00	GWU	Paul SCHUMACHER 35 yd Field Goal	TIED 17-17
4	13:08	GWU	Deonte SWINTON 71 yd pass from Lucas BEATTY (Paul SCHUMACHER Kick)	GWU 24-17
4	8:25	GWU	Paul SCHUMACHER 21 yd Field Goal	GWU 27-17
4	2:21	CHAR	Austin DUKE 80 yd pass from Matt JOHNSON (Blake BREWER Kick)	GWU 27-24

Gardner–Webb was looking for revenge after the 49ers dramatic 4th quarter, 3 touchdown come-from-behind victory of the year before; that knocked the Bulldogs from the unbeaten in FCS category and also out of the 2013 FCS polls.

Charlotte would get into scoring position on the first drive of the game, capping it with a Blake Brewer 25-yard field goal to take the early lead. On the ensuing kick return, the Bulldogs' J.J. Hubbard would return the ball 95 yards for the touchdown and Gardner-Webb's first lead. On their next possession, the Bulldogs would stretch their lead with a Juanne Blount 21-yard touchdown run. Gardner-Webb's Grayson Gregory would miss a 23-yard field goal on their next drive. The 49ers found the end zone off a Matt Johnson 59-yard touchdown pass to Demarjai Devine. The Bulldogs headed to the second quarter up 14 to 10.

The Bulldogs missed another field goal attempt at the end of their first second-quarter drive. This time Paul Schumacher missed from 32 yards out. Halfway through the quarter, Charlotte's Blake Brewer missed a 47-yard field goal attempt. On the first play of the next drive, the Niners' Branden Dozier intercepted Lucas Beatty's pass and returned the ball 39 yards for the touchdown and the lead. The Bulldogs would get Paul Schumacher within field goal range with time running out. This time he would connect from 35 yards away to end the half. Both teams went into the locker rooms tied at 17.

After their opening drive of the second half stalled, Gardner-Webb's Bradley Taylor would intercept Matt Johnson's pass attempt two plays into the 49ers' drive. Two plays later the 49ers would return the favor when Tyler Maxwell would be intercepted in turn by Dustin Crouser. Blake Brewer would miss his second field goal attempt of the day from 38 yards away. Both teams would head to the final quarter still tied at 17 all.

The Bulldogs scored again on their opening drive of the quarter on a Lucas Beatty 71-yard pass to Deonte Swinton to retake the lead. They stretched their lead on their next possession on a Paul Schumacher 21-yard field goal. Two plays later Matt Johnson would be intercepted again, this time by the Bulldog's Jacob Henderson. With two and a half minutes left, on the first play of their next drive, Matt Johnson would connect an 80-yard touchdown pass with Austin Duke to get the Niners to within three. The subsequent on-sides kick was recovered by the Bulldogs. With a completed third-down conversion, Gardner-Webb ran the clock out and preserved the 27 to 24 win.

Top performers for the game include Gardner-Webb Quarterback Lucas Beatty, who passed for 362 yards, 1 touchdown, and 1 interception. Charlotte Running Back Kalif Phillips had 23 carries for 94 yards. Charlotte Receiver Austin Duke had 7 receptions for 129 yards and a touchdown.

Game Notes:

- Austin Duke set a school record with 80-yard touchdown catch.
- 3rd straight loss by 7 points or less.
- Two 100 yard receivers, a 49ers first, Duke (129) and Demarjai Devine (114).

=== The Citadel Bulldogs ===
The Citadel vs. Charlotte

Team	1	2	3	4	OT	2OT	Total
49ers	7	17	7	18	7	0	56
• Bulldogs	21	14	0	14	7	7	63

- Date: October 11
- Location: Johnson Hagood Stadium
  Charleston, SC
- Game start: 2:00 pm EDT
- Elapsed time: 3:43
- Game attendance: 10,467
- Game weather: 88 °F (31 °C), Sunny, 5 mph (8.0 km/h) N
- Referee: Ted Pitts

Scoring summary
1	13:47	CIT	Cam JACKSON 10 Yd Run (Eric GOINS Kick)	CIT 7-0
1	11:23	CHAR	Austin DUKE 15 Yd Run (Blake BREWER Kick)	TIED 7-7
1	6:25	CIT	Cam JACKSON 9 Yd Run (Eric GOINS Kick)	CIT 14-7
1	5:17	CIT	Brandon EAKINS 7 Yd pass from Aaron MILLER (Eric GOINS Kick)	CIT 21-7
2	14:55	CHAR	Blake BREWER 34 Yd Field Goal	CIT 21-10
2	10:45	CIT	Isiaha SMITH 3 Yd Run (Eric GOINS Kick)	CIT 28-10
2	8:36	CHAR	Trent BOSTICK 13 Yd pass from Matt JOHNSON (Blake BREWER Kick)	CIT 28-17
2	6:25	CIT	Aaron MILLER 4 Yd Run (Eric GOINS Kick)	CIT 35-17
2	6:04	CHAR	Austin DUKE 83 Yd pass from Matt JOHNSON (Blake BREWER Kick)	CIT 35-24
3	12:00	CHAR	Kalif PHILLIPS 26 Yd Run (Blake BREWER Kick)	CIT 35-31
4	13:23	CIT	Dalton TREVINO 10 Yd Run (Eric GOINS Kick)	CIT 42-31
4	10:16	CHAR	Blake BREWER 29 Yd Field Goal	CIT 42-34
4	4:17	CHAR	Austin DUKE 7 Yd pass from Matt JOHNSON (Austin DUKE Pass to Demarjai DEVINE for Two-Point Conversion)	TIED 42-42
4	2:15	CIT	Tyler RENEW 2 Yd Run (Eric GOINS Kick)	CIT 49-42
4	1:49	CHAR	Austin DUKE 71 Yd pass from Matt JOHNSON (Blake BREWER Kick)	TIED 49-49
OT	0:00	CHAR	Maetron THOMAS 25 Yd Run (Blake BREWER Kick)	CHAR 56-49
OT	0:00	CIT	Tyler RENEW 3 Yd Run (Eric GOINS Kick)	TIED 56-56
2OT	0:00	CIT	Brandon EAKINS 17 Yd pass from Aaron MILLER (Eric GOINS Kick)	CIT 63-56

The 49ers returned to the Low Country, this time to take on their first ever SoCon opponents in The Citadel Bulldogs.

The Citadel would strike first on the first drive of the game. Cam Jackson would run it in from 10 yards out to get the Bulldogs on the board first. The 49ers would string together a 12 play drive on their first possession, tying the game up on an Austin Duke 15-yard touchdown run. On their next possession, the Bulldogs would put together a 14 play drive that would be capped by another Cam Jackson touchdown, this time from 9 yards out. On the ensuing kick return, the Citadel's Joe Crochet would force Charlotte's Tre'shun Wynn to fumble the return, which was recovered by the Bulldog's James Riley. Three plays later The Citadel would stretch their lead with an Aaron Miller 7-yard pass to Brandon Eakins. The teams would head to the second quarter with The Citadel up 21 to 7.

Charlotte would add points first in the second quarter on a Blake Brewer 34-yard field goal. On the next series, the Bulldogs would get an Isiaha Smith 3-yard rushing touchdown. The Niners would respond with a Matt Johnson 13-yard touchdown pass to Trent Bostick on the next drive. The Citadel would respond with an Aaron Miller 4-yard rushing touchdown on the next series. Not to be outdone, Charlotte's Matt Johnson would lob an 83-yard touchdown pass to Austin Duke on the first play from scrimmage after getting the ball back. At halftime, the score would be Bulldogs 35, Niners 24.

After the high scoring first half, the second half would begin in similar fashion. Charlotte would put together a 10 play drive, capping it with a Kalif Phillips 26-yard touchdown run to get the score within 3 points. That would prove to be the only score of the third quarter. The last quarter of regulation play would have The Citadel up 34 to 31 on the 49ers.

The Citadel would cap a 12 play drive began in the third quarter with a Dalton Trevino 10-yard rushing touchdown to open the fourth quarter scoring. On Charlotte's first fourth-quarter possession they'd finish an 11 play drive with a Blake Brewer 29-yard field goal. On the Niners' next possession Matt Johnson would connect on a 7-yard touchdown pass to Austin Duke to get within 2 points. Charlotte would tie the game on the two-point conversion attempt when Matt Johnson would hand the ball off to Kalif Phillips, who then gave it to Austin Duke to pass to Dmarjai Devine in the end zone. The next possession would end with the Bulldogs regaining the lead on a Tyler Renew 2-yard rushing touchdown. With slightly more than two minutes left in regulation, Charlotte's Matt Johnson would lob another long touchdown pass, this one for 71 yards, again to Austin Duke to tie the game again. The 49ers' would enter their second overtime of the season and second in team history after both teams went 3 and out on their final possessions of regulation play. The score at the end of regulation was 49 all.

The 49ers would get the ball first in overtime and on the first play Maetron Thomas would take it all the way to the end zone on a 25-yard rush to give the 49ers their first lead of the game. The Citadel would cap their first overtime possession with a Tyler Renew 3-yard rushing touchdown to even the score at 56. The Citadel would get the ball first in double overtime and score on their second play on an Aaron Miller 17-yard pass to Brandon Eakins. Charlotte would put together an 11 play drive in their first double overtime in program history, getting to the Bulldog's 4-yard line, but the game would end on a fourth down incomplete pass from Matt Johnson to Dmarjai Devine that was successfully broken up by the Citadel's Cody Richardson. The final score in double overtime was The Citadel Bulldogs 63, the Charlotte 49ers 56.

Top performers for the game were Charlotte quarterback Matt Johnson, who passed for 358 yards and 4 touchdowns. The Citadel's Aaron Miller had 22 carries for 197 yards and a touchdown. Charlotte's Austin Duke would have 12 receptions for 254 yards and 3 touchdowns.

Game Notes:

- 49ers first double overtime game.
- Austin Duke sets school record 254 yards receiving; 319 all-purpose yards.
- Duke sets school record with 84-yard touchdown catch. Third straight game he has set the record.
- Nico Alcalde becomes first 49er with over 100 career tackles (102).

=== James Madison Dukes ===
JMU vs. Charlotte

Team	1	2	3	4	Total
• Dukes	21	7	10	10	48
49ers	7	7	16	10	40

- Date: October 25
- Location: Jerry Richardson Stadium
  Charlotte, NC
- Game start: 12:05 pm EDT
- Elapsed time: 3:28
- Game attendance: 15,677
- Game weather: 67 °F (19 °C), Clear, 8 mph (13 km/h) NNW
- Referee: Steve LaMantia
- TV announcers (WCCB): Sam Smith, Brett Basanez, Jeff Zell, & Brandon Davidow

Scoring summary
1	12:00	JMU	Daniel BROWN 39 Yd pass from Vad Lee (Ryan MAGLIO Kick)	JMU 7-0
1	9:11	JMU	Vad LEE 5 Yd Run (Ryan MAGLIO Kick)	JMU 14-0
1	4:14	JMU	Ishmael Hyman 8 Yd pass from Vad LEE (Ryan MAGLIO Kick)	JMU 21-0
1	1:19	CHAR	Austin DUKE 98 Yd pass from Matt JOHNSON (Blake BREWER Kick)	JUM 21-7
2	11:01	CHAR	Richard MURPHY 1 Yd pass from Matt JOHNSON (Blake BREWER Kick)	JMU 21-14
2	0:49	JMU	Vad LEE 8 Yd Run (Ryan MAGLIO Kick)	JMU 28-14
3	10:34	CHAR	Kalif PHILLIPS 1 Yd Run (Blake BREWER PAT failed)	JMU 28-20
3	8:24	CHAR	Kalif PHILLIPS 1 Yd Run (Blake BREWER PAT failed)	JMU 28-23
3	4:10	JMU	Andre COBLE 5 Yd pass from Vad LEE (Ryan MAGLIO Kick)	JMU 35-23
3	2:41	CHAR	Kalif PHILLIPS 45 Yd Run (Blake BREWER Kick)	JMU 35-30
3	0:17	JMU	Ryan MAGLIO 49 Yd Field Goal	JMU 38-30
4	12:48	JMU	Ryan MAGLIO 18 Yd Field Goal	JMU 41-30
4	6:32	CHAR	Blake BREWER 47 Yd Field Goal	JMU 41-33
4	3:35	JMU	Brandon RAVENAL 29 Yd pass from Vad LEE (Ryan MAGLIO Kick)	JMU 48-33
4	1:28	CHAR	Lee MCNEILL 8 Yd Run (Blake BREWER Kick)	JMU 48-40

After their first bye week, the 49ers were looking to "return the hospitality" that the Dukes showed them in the 49ers' first ever road loss from the year before.

James Madison would score first on the second drive of the game. A Vad Lee 39-yard pass to Daniel Brown would give them the first of their three first quarter touchdowns. On Charlotte's next drive the Niners would get to the Dukes' 38 yard line, but Blake Brewer would miss the 55-yard field goal attempt. The Dukes would get their next score on the next series on a Vad Lee 5-yard rushing touchdown. On their next possession the Dukes would complete a twelve play drive with a Vad Lee 8-yard touchdown pass to Ishmael Hyman. With time running out in the quarter, the 49ers would get their first points of the game on the longest scoring pass play in the program's history. A 98-yard completion from Matt Johnson to Austin Duke. The score at the end of the first quarter was Dukes 21, Niners 7.

Charlotte would get the first points of the second quarter on a Matt Johnson 1-yard touchdown pass to Richard Murphy to get then Niners within a touchdown of the Dukes. Both teams would struggle to get first downs throughout most of the quarter. Charlotte quarterback Matt Johnson would leave the game with a knee injury midway through the quarter. The Dukes would stretch their lead with less than two minutes left before the half with another Vad Lee rushing touchdown, this time from 8 yards out. The score at halftime was James Madison 28, Charlotte 14.

The 49ers would draw back to within one score on their first drive of the second half, an eleven play drive capped by a 1-yard Kaliff Phillips rushing touchdown. The point after attempt by Blake Brewer would fail to split the uprights. Brewer would account for that miss on the Niners' next possession by making a 26-yard field goal. On the next drive James Madison would stretch their lead on a Vad Lee 5-yard touchdown pass to Andre Coble. Charlotte would answer quickly on the next drive with a Kaliff Phillips 45-yard rushing touchdown. On the final play of the third quarter the Dukes would add three points from a Ryan Maglio 49-yard field goal. The score heading into the final quarter of play was Dukes 38, 49ers 30.

The Dukes would tack on another three points on their first series of the fourth quarter with an 18-yard Ryan Maglio field goal. Midway through the quarter Blake Brewer would add another field goal for the Niners, this time from 47 yards. The Dukes would get their final score on a Vad Lee 29-yard touchdown pass to Brandon Ravenel. With less than four minutes left in the game, 49ers' backup quarterback Lee McNeill would orchestrate a ten play drive and take the ball into the end zone himself on an 8-yard run to get the Niners within one touchdown of the Dukes. With one and a half minutes left on the clock the 49ers would attempt the on-side kick recovery, but fail to recover. The Dukes ran the clock out and the final score was the James Madison Dukes 48, the Charlotte 49ers 40.

Top performers for the game were James Madison quarterback Vad Lee, who passed for 333 yards and 4 touchdowns. Charlotte rusher Kaliff Phillips had 22 carries for 168 yards and two touchdowns. Charlotte's Austin Duke would have 7 receptions for 162 yards and a touchdown.

Game Notes:

- Fourth straight week Austin Duke has set the school record for longest touchdown pass, 98 yards.
- Duke becomes first 49er with 1,000 yards receiving in a single season (1128).

=== #2 Coastal Carolina Chanticleers ===
Coastal Carolina vs. Charlotte

Team	1	2	3	4	Total
• #3 Chanticlieers	14	21	14	10	59
49ers	0	7	14	13	34

- Date: November 8
- Location: Jerry Richardson Stadium
  Charlotte, NC
- Game start: 12:00 pm EST
- Elapsed time: 3:09
- Game attendance: 12,052
- Game weather: 54 °F (12 °C), Partly Cloudy, 1 mph (1.6 km/h)
- Referee: Clay Martin
- TV announcers (WCCB): Sam Smith, Brett Basanez, Jeff Zell, & Brandon Davidow

Scoring summary
1	8:14	CCU	Alex ROSS run for 3 yds for a TD, (Alex CATRON KICK)	CCU 7-0
1	6:40	CCU	De'Angelo Henderson run for 1 yd for a TD, (Alex CATRON KICK)	CCU 14-0
2	14:33	CCU	Devin BROWN run for 10 yds for a TD, (Alex CATRON KICK)	CCU 21-0
2	8:47	CCU	Osharmar ABERCROMBIE run for 1 yd for a TD, (Alex CATRON KICK)	CCU 28-7
2	7:53	CCU	Lee MCNEILL sacked by Pernell WILLIAMS for a loss of 10 yards Lee MCNEILL fumbled, recovered by CCU Roderick HOLDER, return for 0 yards, return for 7 yds, (Alex CATRON KICK)	CCU 35-0
2	4:05	CHAR	Lee MCNEILL pass complete to T.L. FORD for 5 yds for a TD, (Blake BREWER KICK)	CCU 35-7
3	13:26	CCU	Alex ROSS run for 41 yds for a TD, (Alex CATRON KICK)	CCU 42-7
3	7:05	CHAR	Kalif PHILLIPS run for 51 yds for a TD, (Blake BREWER KICK)	CCU 42-14
3	1:53	CCU	Osharmar ABERCROMBIE run for 4 yds for a TD, (Alex CATRON KICK)	CCU 49-14
3	1:40	CHAR	Ryan GRANGER kickoff for 60 yds, Damarrell ALEXANDER return for 95 yds for a TD, (Blake BREWER KICK)	CCU 49-21
4	13:08	CCU	Ryan GRANGER 32 yd FG GOOD	CCU 52-21
4	10:48	CHAR	Lee MCNEILL run for 1 yd for a TD, (Blake BREWER KICK)	CCU 52-28
4	4:16	CCU	Zach SILVERBERG run for 2 yds for a TD, (Masamitsu ISHIBASHI KICK)	CCU 59-28
4	2:32	CHAR	Lee MCNEILL pass complete to Justin BOLUS for 18 yds for a TD, (Blake BREWER PAT MISSED)	CCU 59-34

The #3/#6 ranked "Chants" drubbed the 49ers 50 to 25 at the beach the previous season. The 49ers were looking to return the favor as the Chanticleers visited the Queen City for the first time, with the second ranked team in FCS.

Coastal would score on their first drive with an Alex Ross 3-yard rushing touchdown. On the Chants' next drive De'Angelo Henderson would score a 1-yard rushing touchdown. Late in the quarter the Chants would get within field goal range but Alex Catron would miss from 37 yards out. The score at the end of the first quarter was 14 to 0 Chanticleers.

On the second play of the second quarter the Chants would pad their score off a Devine Brown 10-yard touchdown run. The 49ers' Blake Brewer would miss a 44-yard field goal attempt on their first possession of the quarter. On the next possession the Chants would tack on another rushing touchdown, this one on an Osharmar Abercrombie 1 yard punch. On the third play of Charlotte's next drive, Lee McNeill would fumble on a sack by Parnell Williams. Roderick Holder would recover the fumble and score a 7-yard touchdown for the Chants. On their next possession, the 49ers would string together a 14 play drive to get their first score of the day; a Lee McNeill 5-yard touchdown pass to T.L. Ford. The score at the half was 35 to 7 Chanticleers.

The Chants would score on their first possession of the second half on an Alex Ross 41-yard touchdown run. Kaliff Phillips would get Charlotte their second touchdown of the day on a 51-yard breakaway rush. On their next drive the Chants would return the favor on an Osharmar Abercrombie 4-yard touchdown run. On the ensuing kick return the 49ers's Damarrell Alexander would take the ball back 95 yards for a touchdown. Heading into the final quarter, the score was 49 to 21 Coastal Carolina.

Ryan Granger would get Coastal their only Field Goal of the day on the first possession of the fourth quarter from 32 yards out. On their first possession of the quarter, Lee McNeill would get the 49ers a 1-yard rushing touchdown. On their next possession, the Chants would put together a time-eating thirteen play drive, and cap it with a Zach Silverberg 2-yard rushing touchdown. On their next drive the 49ers' Lee McNeill would complete a touchdown pass to Justin Bolus from 18 yards out. Charlotte would attempt and on-side kick recovery, but Coastal would recover the ball and run out the clock. The final score was Coastal Carolina 59, Charlotte 34.

Top performers for the game would include Charlotte Quarterback Lee McNeill who would get 236 yards and 1 passing and one rushing touchdown in his first career start. Charlotte's Kaliff Phillips would have 26 carries for 159 yards and a touchdown. Coastal's Tyrell Blanks would have 10 receptions for 105 yards.

Game Notes:

- Kaliff Phillips became the 49ers' first 1000-yard rusher, with 1081 yards on the season.

=== #4 (DIII) Wesley College Wolverines ===
Wesley College vs. Charlotte

Team	1	2	3	4	Total
Wolverines	14	10	3	6	33
• 49ers	14	14	3	7	38

- Date: November 15
- Location: Jerry Richardson Stadium
  Charlotte, NC
- Game start: 12:00 pm EST
- Elapsed time: 3:17
- Game attendance: 10,704
- Game weather: 40 °F (4 °C), Clear, 3 mph (4.8 km/h)
- Referee: Wayne Winkler
- TV announcers (ASN, WCCB): Mike Gleason, Jim Donnan

Scoring summary
1	13:02	CHAR	Kalif PHILLIPS 4 Yd Run (Blake BREWER Kick)	CHAR 7-0
1	11:21	WESL	Jamar BAYNARD 66 Yd pass from Joe CALLAHAN (Eric SPEIDEL Kick)	TIED 7-7
1	9:11	WESL	Bryce SHADE 9 Yd pass from Joe CALLAHAN (Eric SPEIDEL Kick)	WESL 14-7
1	2:35	CHAR	Kalif PHILLIPS 10 Yd Run (Blake BREWER Kick)	TIED 14 -14
2	12:59	WESL	Joe CALLAHAN 2 Yd Run (Eric SPEIDEL Kick)	WESL 21-14
2	10:00	CHAR	Kalif PHILLIPS 16 Yd Run (Blake BREWER Kick)	TIED 21-21
2	6:06	CHAR	Trent BOSTICK 9 Yd pass from Lee MCNEILL (Blake BREWER Kick)	CHAR 28-21
2	0:00	WESL	Eric SPEIDEL 32 Yd Field Goal	CHAR 28-24
3	6:09	CHAR	Blake BREWER 29 Yd Field Goal	CHAR 31-24
3	0:38	WESL	Eric SPEIDEL 20 Yd Field Goal	CHAR 31-27
4	12:00	CHAR	T.L. FORD 12 Yd pass from Lee MCNEILL (Blake BREWER Kick)	CHAR 38-27
4	1:11	WESL	Joe CALLAHAN 1 Yd Run (Two-Point Run Conversion Failed)	CHAR 38-33

The #4 ranked DIII Wesley College Wolverines returned to Charlotte to face the 49ers for the second time in as many years.

The 49ers would score on their first possession of the game, a 4-yard Kaliff Phillips rushing touchdown. The Wolverines would return the favor on their first drive on a Joe Callahan 66-yard touchdown pass to Jamar Baynard. Charlotte quarterback Lee McNeill would fumble on the next drive on a sack by Amir Petrose, which would be recovered by the Wolverines's Roderick Caine. This would set up a Joe Callahan 9-yard touchdown pass to Bryce Slade to give the Wolverines their first lead. Later in the quarter Joe Callahan's pass would be intercepted by Charlotte's Desmond Cooper. This would lead four plays later to Kaliff Phillip's second rushing Touchdown of the quarter, from 10 yards away; the first quarter would end tied at 14 all.

Wesley would retake the lead on their first drive of the second quarter, capping it with a Joe Callahan 2-yard rushing touchdown. The 49ers would tie the game again on their next possession, a twelve play drive finished by Kaliff Phillip's third touchdown run of the day, this time from 16 yards out. On their next possession the 49ers would retake the lead on a Lee McNeill 9-yard touchdown pass to Trent Bostick. On their next drive Lee McNeill would be sacked again, this time by Roderick Caine who would also recover the ball for the Wolverines. This would lead several plays later to a last play of the half 32-yard field goal by Eric Spidel to get the Wolverines within 4 points. AT halftime the score was 49ers up 28 to 24.

Wesley's first drive of the second half would end on a Joe Callahan interception by the 49ers' Daquan Lucas. On the Wolverine's next drive Charlotte's Juwan Foggie would block the punt return, setting up the 49ers' only points of the quarter. Neither team would score until nearly halfway through the third quarter, when Charlotte's Blake Brewer would split the uprights from 32 yards out. The Wolverines would return the favor on their next drive, capping a fifteen play series with a 20-yard Eric Spiedel field goal. The Score heading into the final quarter of play would be 49ers 31, Wolverines 27.

On the first series of the fourth quarter the 49ers' Lee McNeill would get a 12-yard touchdown pass into the hands of T.L. Ford to stretch their lead. With less than two minutes left in the game, the Wolverines would score on a Joe Callahan 1-yard run, but the two-point conversion attempt would fail. The Wolverines would make the on-side kick attempt but the 49ers would recover and run out the clock. The final score was Charlotte 38, Wesley College 33.

Top performers for the game were Wesley quarterback Joe Callahan, who passed for 356 yards, two touchdowns and one interception. Charlotte's Kaliff Phillips had 36 carries for 173 yards and three touchdowns. Wesley receiver Jamar Baynard had 5 receptions for 97 yards and a touchdown.

Game Notes:

- Charlotte broke their previous longest losing streak of 6 games with the victory.
- Austin Duke's 92 reception yards pushed his career total over 2,000 yards, becoming the first 49er to reach that mark.

=== Morehead State Eagles ===
Morehead State vs. Charlotte

Team	1	2	3	4	Total
Eagles	0	0	7	7	14
• 49ers	24	7	21	0	52

- Date: November 23
- Location: Jerry Richardson Stadium
  Charlotte, NC
- Game start: 12:00 pm EST
- Elapsed time: 2:59
- Game attendance: 10,826
- Game weather: 52 °F (11 °C), Clear, 4 mph (6.4 km/h) N
- Referee: Rodney Burnette
- TV announcers (WCCB): Sam Smith, Brett Basanez, Jeff Zell, & Brandon Davidow

Scoring summary
1	12:06	CHAR	Blake BREWER 51 Yd Field Goal	CHAR 3-0
1	10:00	CHAR	Kalif PHILLIPS 59 Yd Run (Blake BREWER Kick)	CHAR 10-0
1	8:14	CHAR	Damarrell ALEXANDER 5 Yd Run (Blake BREWER Kick)	CHAR 17-0
1	2:13	CHAR	Kalif PHILLIPS 37 Yd Run (Blake BREWER Kick)	CHAR 24-0
2	13:06	CHAR	Richard MURPHY 71 Yd pass from Lee MCNEILL (Blake BREWER Kick)	CHAR 31-0
3	12:45	CHAR	T.L. FORD 21 Yd pass from Lee MCNEILL (Blake BREWER Kick)	CHAR 38-0
3	9:14	CHAR	Kalif PHILLIPS 2 Yd Run (Blake BREWER Kick)	CHAR 45-0
3	2:00	MORE	Brandon BORNHAUSER 18 Yd pass from Austin GAHAFER (Luke BOYD Kick)	CHAR 45-7
3	1:42	CHAR	Damarrell ALEXANDER 63 Yd Run (Stephen MUSCARELLO Kick)	CHAR 52-7
4	8:15	MORE	Jake RAYMOND 16 Yd pass from Austin GAHAFER (Luke BOYD Kick)	CHAR 52-14

For the second year in a row the 49ers closed out the season facing the Morehead State Eagles, this time inside the friendly confines of Jerry Richardson Stadium.

Charlotte would score first on their first series of the game, a 51-yard Blake Brewer field goal. On the next series the 49ers' Jalen Holt would intercept an Austin Gahafer pass but fumble the ball back to the Eagles. Three plays later Gahafer would be intercepted again, this time by Greg Cunningham Jr. On the very next play, Kaliff Phillips would score a 59-yard rushing touchdown to pad the 49ers's early lead. On the next series Gahafer would have his third interception of the first quarter, this time by the 49ers' senior Desmond Cooper, playing in his final regular season collegiate game. Six plays later the 49ers would add another touchdown on a Damarrell Alexander 5-yard run. Kaliff Phillips would close out the first quarter scoring on his second rushing touchdown, this time from 37 yards out. The first quarter score was Charlotte 24, Morehead State 0.

On the second play of the second quarter, Charlotte quarterback Lee McNeill would connect with Richard Murphy on a 71-yard touchdown pass. Late in the quarter Morehead State kicker Luke Boyd would miss a 48-yard field goal attempt. On the next series Charlotte's Blake Brewer would miss a 52-yard field goal attempt. The score at halftime was 49ers 31, Eagles 0.

On the first series of the second half, Lee McNeill would complete a 21-yard touchdown pass to T.L. Ford. On the 49ers' next series Kaliff Phillips would get his third rushing touchdown, from 2 yards out. Later in the third quarter, Morehead State would find the scoreboard on an Austin Gahafer 18-yard touchdown pass to Brandon Bornhauser. Two plays later Charlotte's Demarrell Alexander would score his second rushing touchdown on a 63-yard breakaway run. Heading to the final quarter the 49ers would have a comfortable 52 to 7 lead.

Morehead State would get the final score of the game on an Austin Gahafer 16-yard touchdown pass to Jake Raymond. After several unproductive series by both teams the clock would run out, with Charlotte closing out the season with a 52 to 7 victory.

Top performers would include Charlotte quarterback Lee McNeill, who would finish the day with 193 yards passing and two touchdowns. The 49ers' Kaliff Phillips would have 18 carries for 187 yards and three touchdowns. Charlotte's Richard Murphy would have 3 receptions for 92 yards and a touchdown.

Game Notes:

- Six seniors would participate in their final collegiate game: Daniel Blitch, Tyler DeStefani, Dmarjai Devine, Peter Fields, Quintin Gay, Mark Montini.
- This was also senior Desmond Cooper's final regular season game. He was invited to participate in the Inaugural FCS BOWL on Dec. 7th.
- Kaliff Phillips finished the season with a school-record 20 touchdowns and a record 1441 rushing yards.

== Attendance ==
Season	Games	Sellouts	W–L (%)	Attendance	Average	Best
2014	6	2	3–3 (.500)	79,632	13,272	15,875
