= Brad Lambert (American football) =

American football player and coach (born 1965)

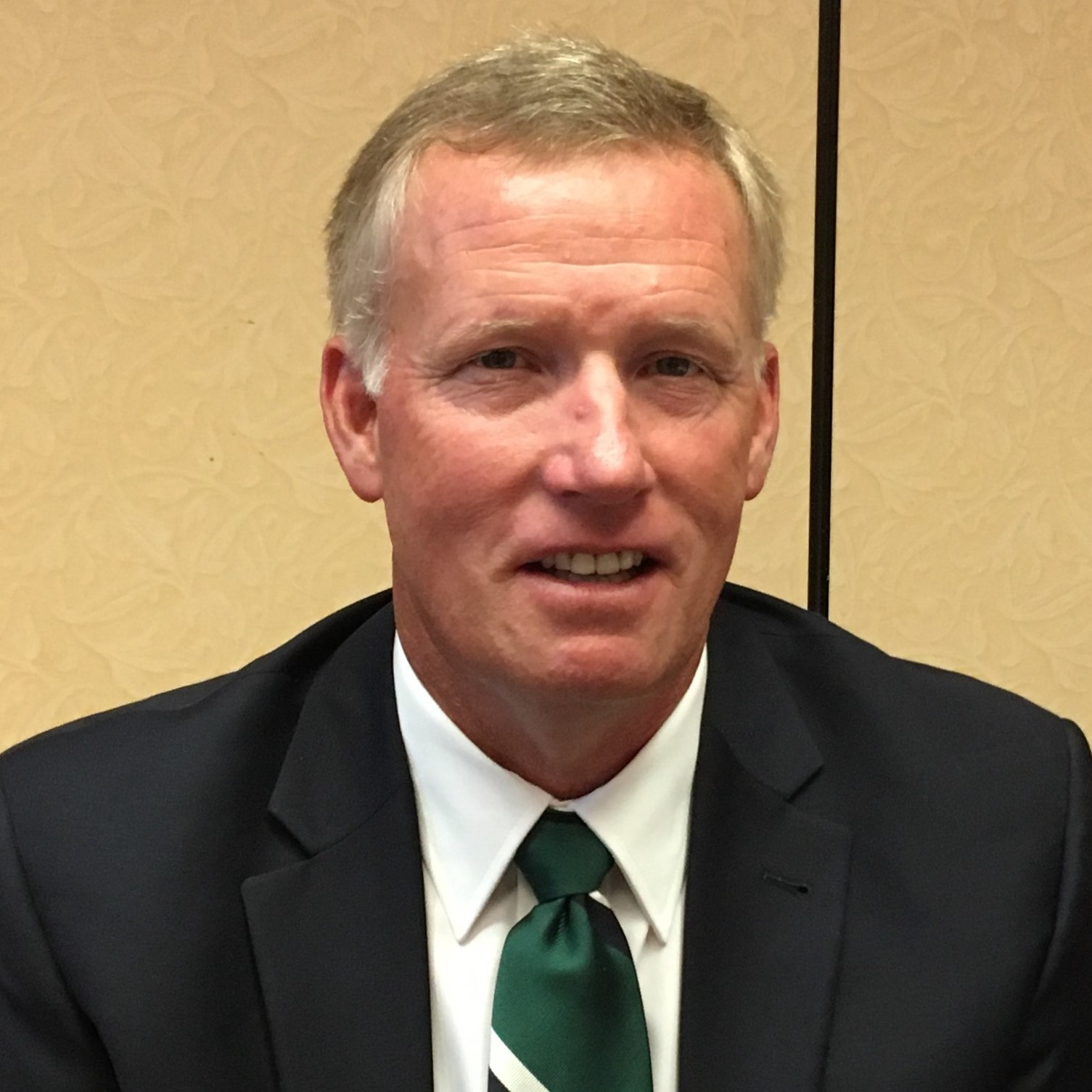
- Lambert at 2017 C-USA Media Days

Current position
- Title: Defensive coordinator
- Team: Marshall
- Conference: Sun Belt

Biographical details
- Born: January 14, 1965 (age 61); Hoxie, Kansas, U.S.

Playing career
- 1983–1986: Kansas State
- Position: Defensive back

Coaching career (HC unless noted)
- 1988–1989: Oklahoma (GA)
- 1990: Marshall (DE)
- 1991–1995: Marshall (DB)
- 1996–1998: Georgia (ST/DL)
- 1998–1999: Georgia (LB)
- 2000: Georgia (DB)
- 2001–2007: Wake Forest (LB)
- 2008–2010: Wake Forest (DC/DB)
- 2011–2018: Charlotte
- 2019: Marshall (DC/LB)
- 2020: Marshall (DC/S)
- 2021: Purdue (co-DC/LB)
- 2022–2024: Wake Forest (DC/LB)
- 2025: Kentucky (DA)
- 2026–present: Marshall (DC)

Head coaching record
- Overall: 22–48

Accomplishments and honors

Awards
- Second-team All-Big Eight (1984)

Brad Lambert (born January 14, 1965) is an American college football coach who serves as a defensive coordinator at Marshall University. He previously served as the co-defensive coordinator and linebackers coach at Wake Forest University. He was the head coach at UNC-Charlotte from 2011 to 2018, and helped transition the 49ers football program from conception through a two year stint in the Football Championship Subdivision to the Football Bowl Subdivision in 2015, when the program joined the rest of the 49ers' sports in programs in Conference USA.

== Playing career ==
Lambert played defensive back for the Kansas State Wildcats, lettering for four straight seasons and graduating in 1987. He earned second-team all-Big Eight honors his freshman season. He also was an all-Big Eight Academic choice from 1984 to 1986.

== Coaching career ==
=== Oklahoma ===
Lambert began his coaching career as a graduate assistant with the Oklahoma Sooners.

=== Marshall (first stint) ===
Lambert's first assistant coaching position was under head coach Jim Donnan with the Marshall Thundering Herd from 1990 to 1995. While at Marshall, Lambert participated in four NCAA Division I-AA Football Championship Games with Marshall winning the 1992 NCAA Division I-AA Football Championship.

=== Georgia ===
Lambert continued to work for Coach Donnan when the latter became head coach for the Georgia Bulldogs, coaching there from 1996 to 2000. At Georgia Lambert coached in the 1998 Outback Bowl, the 1998 Peach Bowl, the 2000 Outback Bowl, and the 2000 Oahu Bowl. Georgia compiled a 40–19 record during Lambert's time with the Bulldogs.

=== Wake Forest ===
After the 2000 football season, Lambert accepted the linebacker coaching position under head coach Jim Grobe with the Wake Forest Demon Deacons. In 2007 Lambert was promoted to defensive coordinator for the Demon Deacons. At Wake Forest Lambert was part of the 2006 ACC Championship Game team. He coached 2008 Butkus Award winner Aaron Curry, who would go on to play in the NFL and eventually serve as an assistant coach for Lambert at Charlotte.

=== Charlotte ===
Lambert was hired as the first-ever head football coach for the Charlotte 49ers on March 1, 2011 In his first game, Lambert led the 49ers to a decisive 52–7 victory at home over the Campbell Fighting Camels. Lambert led the 49ers to a 5–6 record in their inaugural season. On September 4, 2015, Lambert led the 49ers to their first FBS victory, over the Georgia State Panthers. The team failed to have a winning season during its first four seasons, finishing the 2017 season with a 1–11 record and going 12–36 over the course of four FBS seasons. Lambert was released by Charlotte on November 18, 2018 effective after the season, after going 22–48 in six seasons.

=== Marshall (second stint) ===
Lambert returned to Marshall to serve as a defensive assistant and likely defensive coordinator. After his contract terms with Charlotte were negotiated, Thundering Herd coach Doc Holliday named Lambert his defensive coordinator.

=== Purdue ===
Lambert was hired as a co-defensive coordinator and linebackers coach at Purdue in 2021.

=== Wake Forest (second stint) ===
In 2022 Lambert returned to Wake Forest, replacing Lyle Hemphill as the team’s defensive coordinator. Following the 2024 season, newly hired head coach Jake Dickert did not retain Lambert.

=== Marshall (third stint) ===
After the 2025 season, Lambert returned to Marshall as defensive coordinator under head coach, Tony Gibson.

== Personal ==
Lambert is married and has three children.

== Head coaching record ==
Year	Team	Overall	Conference	Standing	Bowl/playoffs
Charlotte 49ers (NCAA Division I FCS independent) (2013–2014)
2013	Charlotte	5–6			
2014	Charlotte	5–6			
Charlotte 49ers (Conference USA) (2015–2018)
2015	Charlotte	2–10	0–8	7th (East)	
2016	Charlotte	4–8	3–5	5th (East)	
2017	Charlotte	1–11	1–7	7th (East)	
2018	Charlotte	5–7	4–4	4th (East)	
Charlotte:		22–48	8–24		
Total:		22–48			
