= Ben DeLuca =

American football player (born 1998)

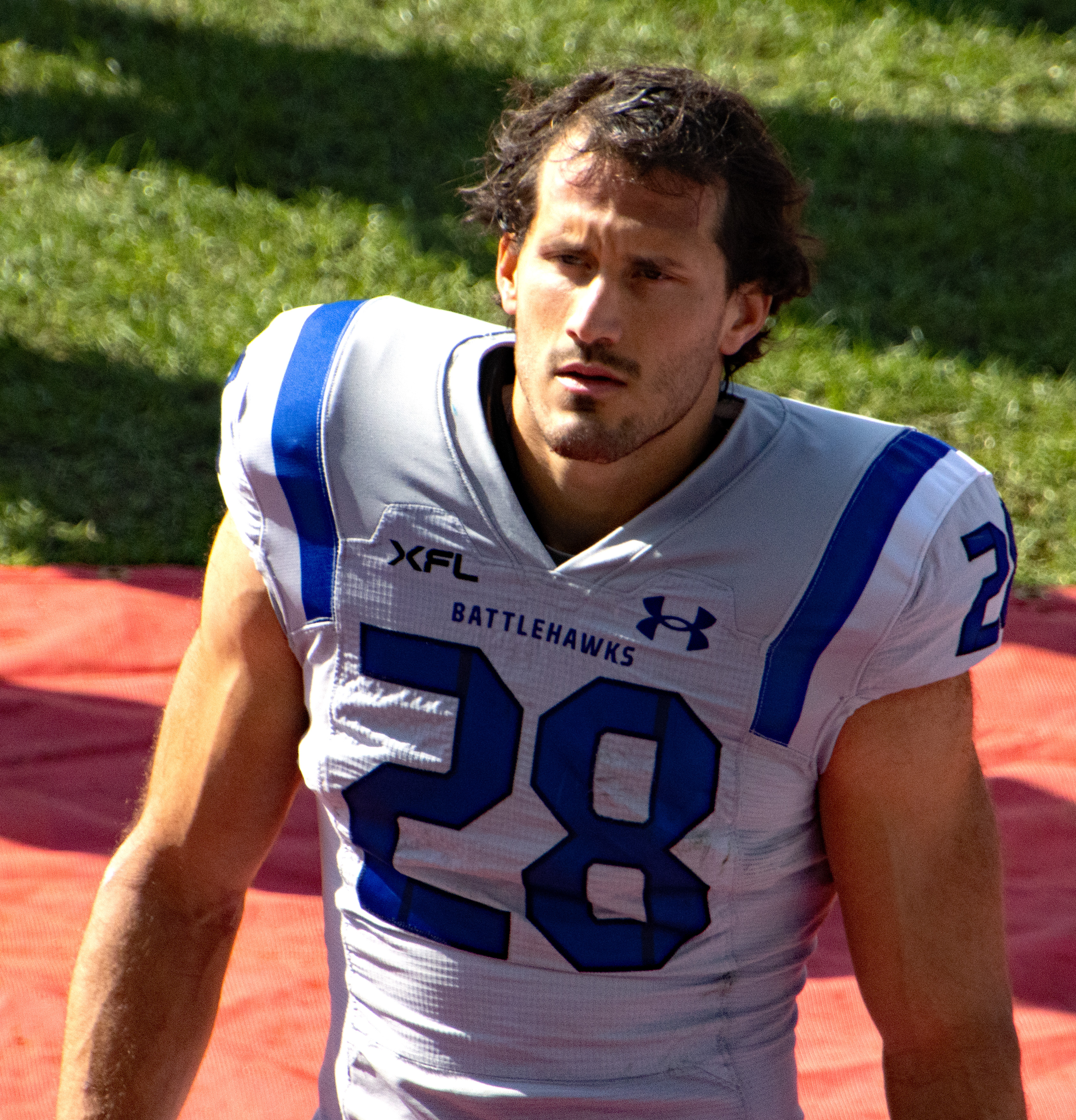
- DeLuca with the St. Louis BattleHawks in 2023

Profile
- Position: Safety

Personal information
- Born: April 9, 1998 (age 28); Orlando, Florida, U.S.
- Listed height: 6 ft 1 in (1.85 m)
- Listed weight: 202 lb (92 kg)

Career information
- High school: Bishop Moore (Orlando, Florida)
- College: Charlotte (2016–2020)
- NFL draft: 2021: undrafted

Career history
- Los Angeles Chargers (2021–2022); St. Louis BattleHawks (2023–2024); Calgary Stampeders (2025)*
- * Offseason or practice squad member only

Career NFL statistics
- Games played: 3
- Stats at Pro Football Reference
- Stats at CFL.ca

Stephen Benito DeLuca Jr. (born April 9, 1998) is an American professional football safety. He played college football at Charlotte.

== College career ==
DeLuca was a member of the Charlotte 49ers for five seasons. He suffered a shoulder injury in the second game of his senior season and utilized a medical redshirt. DeLuca finished his college career with 313 tackles, nine forced fumbles, six fumble recoveries, and 17 passes broken up, all of which are school records, and had four interceptions.

== Professional career ==
=== Los Angeles Chargers ===
DeLuca signed with the Los Angeles Chargers as an undrafted free agent on May 3, 2021. He was waived on August 31, 2021, during final roster cuts and was re-signed to the practice squad the next day. DeLuca was elevated to the active roster on December 12, 2021, for the team's Week 14 game against the New York Giants. He signed a reserve/future contract with the Chargers on January 11, 2022.

On August 30, 2022, DeLuca was waived by the Chargers.

=== St. Louis BattleHawks ===
On November 17, 2022, DeLuca was drafted by the St. Louis BattleHawks of the XFL. He was placed on the team's reserve list on March 23, 2023. He re-signed with the team on January 29, 2024. He was placed on injured reserve on April 18, 2024. He was activated on May 30.

=== Calgary Stampeders ===
On March 19, 2025, DeLuca signed with the Calgary Stampeders of the Canadian Football League (CFL). He was released on May 17, 2025.
