= Deshawn Purdie =

American football player (born 2006)

No. 5 – Liberty Flames
- Position: Quarterback
- Class: Junior

Personal information
- Born: May 5, 2006 (age 20)
- Listed height: 6 ft 4 in (1.93 m)
- Listed weight: 228 lb (103 kg)

Career information
- High school: Milford Mill Academy (Baltimore, Maryland)
- College: Charlotte (2024); Wake Forest (2025); Liberty (2026–present)
- Stats at ESPN

Deshawn Purdie (born May 5, 2006) is an American college football quarterback for the Liberty Flames. He previously played for the Charlotte 49ers and Wake Forest Demon Deacons.

== Early life ==
Purdie attended Milford Mill Academy in Baltimore, Maryland. He was rated as a three-star recruit and committed to play college football for the Charlotte 49ers over offers from schools such as Maryland, Akron, and James Madison.

== College career ==
=== Charlotte ===
In week 2 of the 2024 season, Purdie got his first career start as a true freshman versus Gardner–Webb. In week 13, he completed 16 of 30 passes for 396 yards and three touchdowns in a win over Florida Atlantic. Purdie finished the 2024 season splitting time at quarterback, and completed 100 of 200 pass attempts for 1,802 yards and ten touchdowns to six interceptions. After the season, he entered his name into the NCAA transfer portal.

=== Wake Forest ===
On December 22, 2024, Purdie initially transferred to play for the Florida Gators. On January 17, 2025, he committed to play at Wake Forest.

=== Statistics ===
Year	Team	Games			Passing								Rushing			
Year	Team	GP	GS	Record	Cmp	Att	Pct	Yds	Y/A	TD	Int	Rtg	Att	Yds	Avg	TD
2024	Charlotte	9	6	4–2	100	200	50.0	1,802	9.0	10	6	136.2	41	-130	-3.2	1
2025	Wake Forest	8	2	2–0	41	82	50.0	618	7.5	6	3	130.1	11	-11	-1.0	0
2026	Liberty	11	11	10–1	142	222	64.0	2,113	9.5	14	1	163.6	68	217	3.2	1
Career		28	19	16–3	283	504	56.2	4,533	9.0	30	10	147.4	120	70	0.6	2
