= Markees Watts =

American football player (born 1999)

No. 58
- Position: Linebacker

Personal information
- Born: December 7, 1999 (age 26); Lancaster, South Carolina, U.S.
- Listed height: 6 ft 1 in (1.85 m)
- Listed weight: 240 lb (109 kg)

Career information
- High school: Lancaster
- College: Charlotte (2018–2022)
- NFL draft: 2023: undrafted

Career history
- Tampa Bay Buccaneers (2023–2025); Cleveland Browns (2026)*
- * Offseason or practice squad member only

Career NFL statistics
- Total tackles: 13
- Sacks: 1.5
- Stats at Pro Football Reference

Markees Watts (born December 7, 1999) is an American former professional football player who was a linebacker in the National Football League (NFL). He played college football for the Charlotte 49ers and was signed by the Tampa Bay Buccaneers as an undrafted free agent in 2023.

== Early life ==
Watts was born on December 7, 1999, and grew up in Lancaster, South Carolina. He attended Lancaster High School and earned back-to-back regional defensive player of the year awards as a sophomore and junior, after having compiled 27 sacks during that time. He had a season-ending injury on the first play of his senior season. Ranked a two-star recruit, he committed to play college football for the Charlotte 49ers.

== College career ==
As a true freshman at Charlotte in 2018, Watts played all 12 games and had two tackles. The following year, he started all 13 games and placed third in the conference with 9.5 sacks, being named honorable mention All-Conference USA. He played five games, one as a starter, in the COVID-19-shortened 2020 season. In 2021, he started all 12 games and led them in tackles-for-loss (9.0) and placed second in sacks (4.0).

== Professional career ==
Pre-draft measurables
Height	Weight	Arm length	Hand span	Wingspan	40-yard dash	10-yard split	20-yard split	20-yard shuttle	Three-cone drill	Vertical jump	Broad jump	Bench press
6 ft 0 1/2 in (1.84 m)	234 lb (106 kg)	33 in (0.84 m)	9 3/8 in (0.24 m)	6 ft 8 5/8 in (2.05 m)	4.74 s	1.69 s	2.73 s	4.42 s	7.09 s	31.5 in (0.80 m)	10 ft 4 in (3.15 m)	23 reps
All values from Pro Day

=== Tampa Bay Buccaneers ===
Watts signed with the Tampa Bay Buccaneers as an undrafted free agent on May 12, 2023. In his three years with Tampa, Watts was a primary special teamer through 27 games played.

=== Cleveland Browns ===
On May 19, 2026, Watts signed with the Cleveland Browns. He retired from professional football on June 2.
