= Grant DuBose =

American football player (born 2001)

No. 86 – Ottawa Redblacks
- Position: Wide receiver
- Roster status: Active
- CFL status: American

Personal information
- Born: June 20, 2001 (age 25); Montgomery, Alabama, U.S.
- Listed height: 6 ft 2 in (1.88 m)
- Listed weight: 201 lb (91 kg)

Career information
- High school: Park Crossing (Montgomery)
- College: Miles (2019–2020); Charlotte (2021–2022)
- NFL draft: 2023: 7th round, 256th overall pick

Career history
- Green Bay Packers (2023); Miami Dolphins (2024); Buffalo Bills (2025)*; Columbus Aviators (2026); Ottawa Redblacks (2026–present)
- * Offseason or practice squad member only

Awards and highlights
- Second-team All-Conference USA (2022)

Career NFL statistics as of 2024
- Receptions: 2
- Receiving yards: 11
- Receiving touchdowns: 0
- Stats at Pro Football Reference

Grant Lewis DuBose (born June 20, 2001) is an American professional football wide receiver for the Ottawa Redblacks of the Canadian Football League (CFL). He played college football for the Miles Golden Bears and Charlotte 49ers.

== Early life ==
DuBose was born on June 20, 2001, in Montgomery, Alabama. He attended Park Crossing High School and was teammates with Malik Cunningham. Despite competing with and against many top prospects, he was a zero-star recruit and had no offers coming into his senior year. He received his only offer, from the Division II Miles College, ten days before signing day and accepted it.

== College career ==
As a freshman at Miles in 2019, DuBose saw limited action as a backup, appearing in ten games while posting 104 receiving yards with one touchdown. The 2020 season was cancelled due to the COVID-19 pandemic, and during that time he worked several part-time jobs, including one bagging groceries and another at Walmart. The next year, DuBose opted to transfer. He met with James Foster, a childhood friend and backup quarterback at Division I FBS Charlotte, and Foster convinced DuBose to attend a summer tryout for the school.

DuBose made the team and exceeded his entire receiving total at Miles in his first game with Charlotte, posting 118 yards and two scores against Duke in the opener. He totaled 62 receptions for 892 yards with six scores on the year. As a senior in 2022, he recorded 64 catches for 792 yards with nine scores, the latter statistic tying a program record. He finished his stint at the school with 24 games played and 126 receptions for 1,684 yards with 15 scores, placing him third in team history in touchdowns even though he only played two years with them.

== Professional career ==
Pre-draft measurables
Height	Weight	Arm length	Hand span	40-yard dash	10-yard split	20-yard split	20-yard shuttle	Three-cone drill	Vertical jump	Broad jump
6 ft 2 3/8 in (1.89 m)	201 lb (91 kg)	31 7/8 in (0.81 m)	9 1/2 in (0.24 m)	4.57 s	1.52 s	2.60 s	4.32 s	6.89 s	35.0 in (0.89 m)	10 ft 5 in (3.18 m)
All values from NFL Combine

=== Green Bay Packers ===
DuBose was selected by the Birmingham Stallions of the United States Football League (USFL) in the seventh round (55th overall) of the 2023 USFL draft. He was later selected by the Green Bay Packers of the National Football League (NFL) in the seventh round (256th overall) of the 2023 NFL draft. He signed his rookie contract on May 8. He was released on August 29, 2023. A day later, he was signed to the Packers' practice squad. He was elevated to the active roster for Week 18 on January 6, 2024.

DuBose signed a reserve/future contract with Green Bay on January 22, 2024. He was released by the Packers on August 27.

=== Miami Dolphins ===
After his release, Dubose was claimed off waivers by the Miami Dolphins on August 28, 2024.

On December 15, 2024, during a game against the Houston Texans, DuBose suffered a severe head injury after a helmet-to-helmet hit by Texans defender Calen Bullock. The injury occurred in the third quarter following a pass DuBose caught over the middle of the field. Medical staff quickly attended to him, stabilizing his condition on the field before he was carted off and prepared for further evaluation. Several days later, DuBose was released from the Houston hospital where he was staying.

=== Buffalo Bills ===
Prior to the 2025 NFL season, DuBose worked out for the San Francisco 49ers and Denver Broncos. On August 19, 2025, DuBose signed with the Buffalo Bills. However, DuBose was waived/injured by the Bills on August 24.

=== Columbus Aviators ===
On April 9, 2026, DuBose signed with the Columbus Aviators of the United Football League (UFL). He was released on May 5.

=== Ottawa Redblacks ===
On August 10, 2026, DuBose signed with the Ottawa Redblacks of the Canadian Football League (CFL). Barnes will make his CFL debut on October 16, in place of the injured Justin Hardy.
