= Austin Duke =

American gridiron football player (born 1993)

Austin P. Duke
Profile
- Position: Wide receiver

Personal information
- Born: August 3, 1993 (age 33); Charlotte, North Carolina, U.S.
- Listed height: 5 ft 10 in (1.78 m)
- Listed weight: 171 lb (78 kg)

Career information
- High school: Independence (Charlotte, North Carolina)
- College: Charlotte
- NFL draft: 2017: undrafted

Career history
- Carolina Panthers (2017–2018)*; Atlanta Legends (2019)*; Toronto Argonauts (2019)*; New York Guardians (2020); Barcelona Dragons (2023)*
- * Offseason or practice squad member only
- Stats at Pro Football Reference

Austin P. Duke (born August 3, 1993) is an American former football player. He signed with the Carolina Panthers of the National Football League (NFL) as an undrafted free agent in 2017. He played college football for Charlotte.

== College football ==
In 2013, Duke began his college football career with the Charlotte 49ers as a member of UNC Charlotte's first varsity football team since 1948. He was the team's leading receiver in each of his four seasons with the 49ers, and would go on to finish his college career in 2016 as their all-time leading receiver in receptions (253), receiving yards (3,437), and receiving touchdowns (24).

== Professional football ==
=== Carolina Panthers ===
On May 5, 2017, Duke signed with the Carolina Panthers of the National Football League (NFL), and spent the remainder of the 2017 NFL season on the Panthers' practice roster.

On January 1, 2018, Duke was signed to a reserve future contract with the Panthers. Duke would go on to participate in the Panthers' training camp, and appeared in 4 NFL preseason games, accumulating 69 yards on 9 receptions. On September 1, 2018, Duke was released by the Panthers at the end of training camp.

=== Atlanta Legends ===
In early 2019, Duke participated in the Alliance of American Football's Atlanta Legends training camp, but was injured and ultimately did not play.

=== Toronto Argonauts ===
On May 27, 2019, he signed with the Canadian Football League (CFL)'s Toronto Argonauts. He was released June 7, 2019.

=== New York Guardians ===
Duke signed with the New York Guardians of the XFL on January 7, 2020, where he was a punt returner. The league suspended operations on April 10, 2020.

=== Barcelona Dragons ===
Duke signed with the Barcelona Dragons of the European League of Football on January 8, 2023 and was released on May 18.
