= Charlotte 49ers football =

University football program

2026 Charlotte 49ers football team
- First season: 1946; 80 years ago (Note: The team played in its first three years of existence (1946–1948), but folded in 1949. The football program was restarted in 2013; 13 years ago.)
- Athletic director: Kevin White
- Head coach: Tim Albin; 2nd season, 1–14 (.067)
- Location: Charlotte, North Carolina
- Stadium: Jerry Richardson Stadium (capacity: 15,314)
- NCAA division: Division I FBS
- Conference: The American
- Colors: Green and white
- All-time record: 51–113 (.311)
- Bowl record: 0–1 (.000)
- Rivalries: Appalachian State East Carolina University Pirates

Uniforms
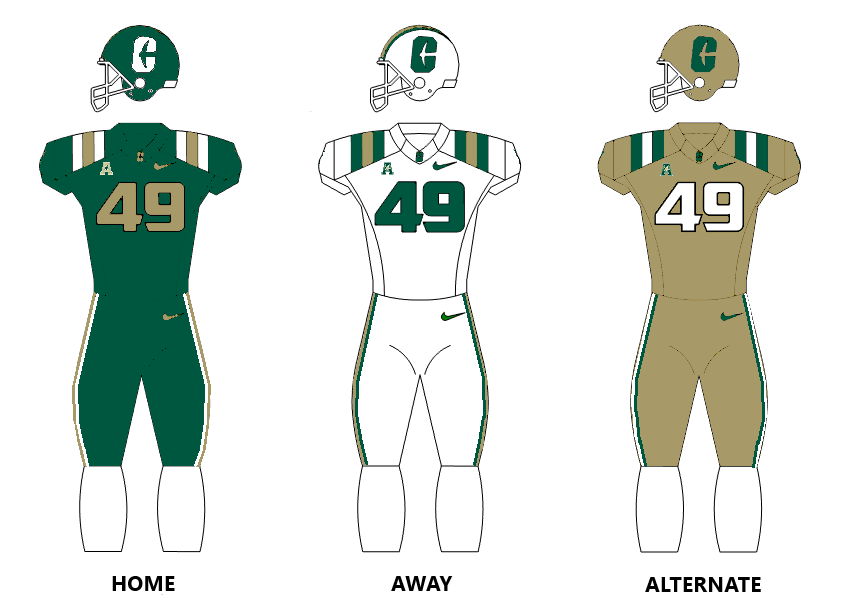
- Fight song: Charlotte 49ers Fight Song
- Mascot: Norm the Niner
- Marching band: The Pride of Niner Nation Marching Band
- Outfitter: Nike
- Website: Charlotte49ers.com

The Charlotte 49ers football program represents the University of North Carolina at Charlotte in college football. The UNC Charlotte Board of Trustees officially voted to add a football program on November 13, 2008, after a unanimous recommendation by the Football Feasibility Committee. It was made possible by Student Government initiatives starting in 2006 by then-student body president Benjamin Comstock and student body vice president Jordan Van Dyne, namely the first step of organizing a transparent student vote on football that disclosed possible hikes in tuition fees as a result of football. The online poll was approved by the Student Senate and administered in collaboration with the University's IT Department. Despite the possibility of potential rises in student fees, the vote clearly displayed a student interest in a football team. The program began play during the 2013 NCAA Division I FCS football season.

== History ==
=== Origins ===
In 1946, 22 young men began practice as the Charlotte Center of the University of North Carolina Owl's first athletic program: a football team. The team finished the season 2–4, with wins over Pembroke State and Belmont Abbey, and losses to Davidson JV, Catawba College JV, and Clemson's "B" team. The team hosted 2 home games that year at American Legion Memorial Stadium. In part due to the effects of fewer World War II veterans entering college in the late 1940s, the football program ended after the 1948 season. The final football game was played on October 27, 1948.

On July 12, 2006, a group of 15 UNC Charlotte students and alumni held the inaugural Charlotte 49er Football Initiative (CFI) meeting. The mission of this group was to "promote the creation of a Division I college football program at Charlotte," eventually employing methods such as a promotional website, merchandise sales and a pledge campaign. A student organization, Charlotte Football Advocates (later CFI Students), became a part of the larger CFI group during the fall of 2006. In February 2007, UNC Charlotte students voted overwhelmingly in favor of football in an official campus-wide vote and the UNC Charlotte Board of Trustees voted to authorize $150,000 to study adding 49ers Football, and establishing a Football Feasibility Committee to be headed by outgoing board president and prominent Charlotte businessman Mac Everett. The committee held several meetings throughout the summer of 2007, plus three public forums in the fall of 2007.

In December 2007, the Football Feasibility Committee voted unanimously to recommend the addition of 49ers football. In September 2008, a major student-led March to the Endzone rally was held on campus. On September 18, 2008, Chancellor Dubois officially recommended adding a 49ers football program with the condition that its fans first raise $5 million to help fund the stadium complex. On November 13, 2008, the UNC Charlotte Board of Trustees voted to add a Charlotte 49ers football program by 2013.

Chancellor Dubois originally recommended that the university start Division I football at the FCS (formerly Division I-AA) level with no timeline to move up to FBS. The team played their first full season in the fall of 2013 as an FCS Independent. On May 4, 2012 Charlotte agreed to rejoin Conference USA for all sports except football in 2013, with football joining in 2015 (the first year the 49ers would be eligible due to the NCAA requirement that start-up programs play a minimum of two years in FCS). Charlotte moved to the FBS in 2015 and became FBS bowl eligible in 2016. The 49ers were founding members of C-USA from 1996 to 2005, but they did not compete in football during that time period. Other schools to join C-USA with Charlotte include Florida Atlantic University, Florida International University, Louisiana Tech University, University of Texas at San Antonio, University of North Texas, and Old Dominion University.

=== Brad Lambert era (2013–2018) ===
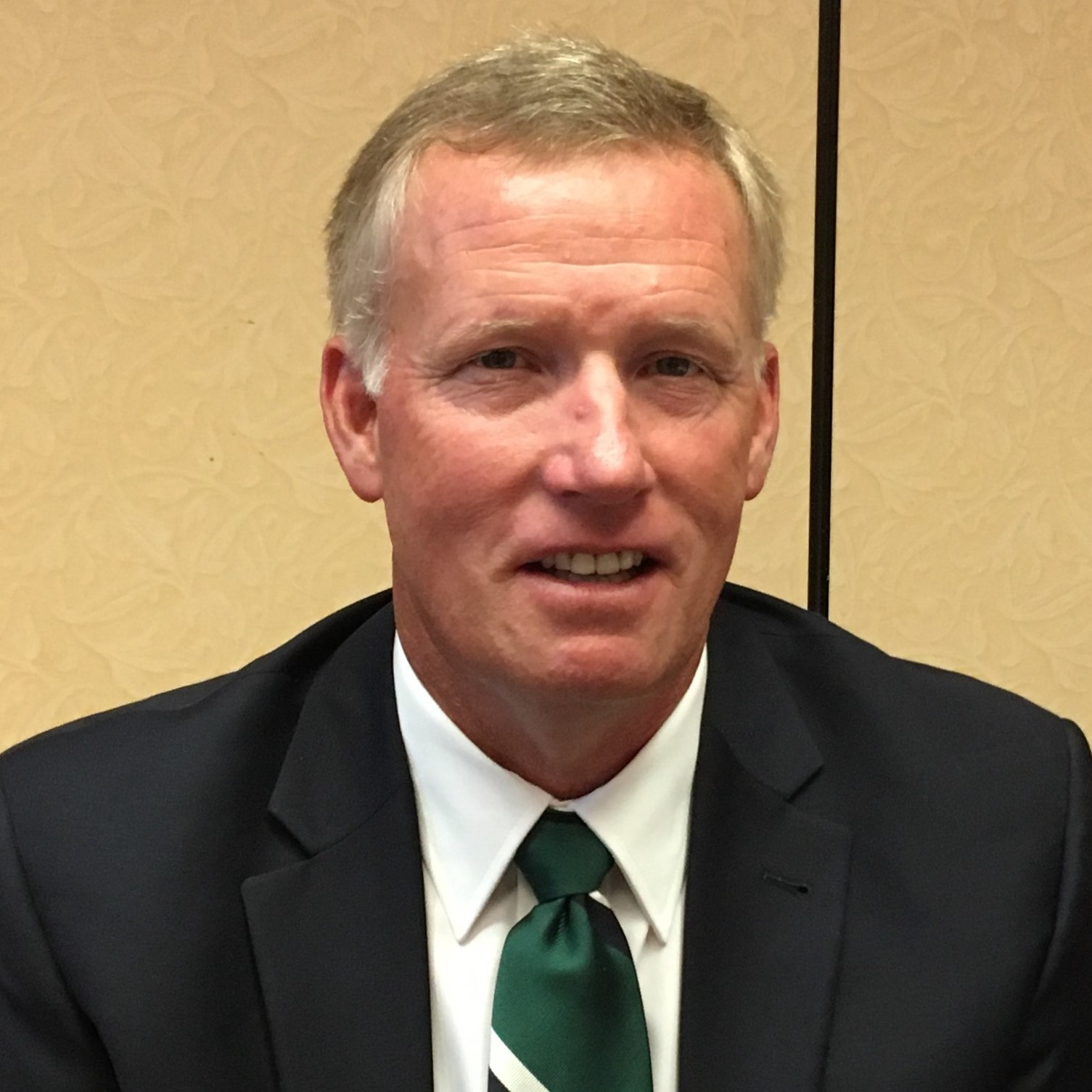
Brad Lambert

On March 1, 2011 the 49ers introduced Wake Forest defensive coordinator Brad Lambert as the program's first head coach.

The 49ers played as an Independent during their two years in the FCS subdivision. Charlotte Football officially joined the FBS subdivision and C-USA Football on July 1, 2015.

On November 18, 2018, Charlotte Athletics Director Mike Hill announced that after 8 years and 6 seasons as head coach, Lambert would not be retained following the season. Lambert had compiled a record of 22–48 during his tenure, including the program's first win in the inaugural game and winning the program's first FBS game. Lambert would finish his career at Charlotte a week later with a season-ending road victory against the previous season conference champion FAU.

=== Will Healy era (2018–2022) ===
On December 5, 2018 Austin Peay's Will Healy was announced as the Charlotte 49ers second head football coach. The 2017 Eddie Robinson Award by STATS for FCS Coach of the Year, had a 8-1 FCS record and a 7–1 record in the Ohio Valley Conference in his second season with the Governors, who previously had a 1–46 record before Healy took over the previous season.

On August 29, 2019, Healy recorded his first win as the head coach of Charlotte in a 49–28 victory against Gardner–Webb. On September 14, he recorded his first career victory over a Football Bowl Subdivision (FBS) opponent with a 52–17 win against UMass. Healy would record his first C-USA win against North Texas on October 26. Healy and the 49ers both would reach bowl eligibility for the first time following a home victory over Marshall November 23 in his first season at the helm. Then on September 3, 2021 in his third season, he would lead the 49ers to their first ever win over a Power Five opponent with a score of 31-28 against Duke at home.

Charlotte fired Healy on October 23, 2022, after a 1–7 start to the season. Healy compiled a 15–24 record at the helm of the 49ers. Pete Rossomando was named interim head coach for the final four games of the season.

=== Francis "Biff" Poggi era (2022–2024) ===
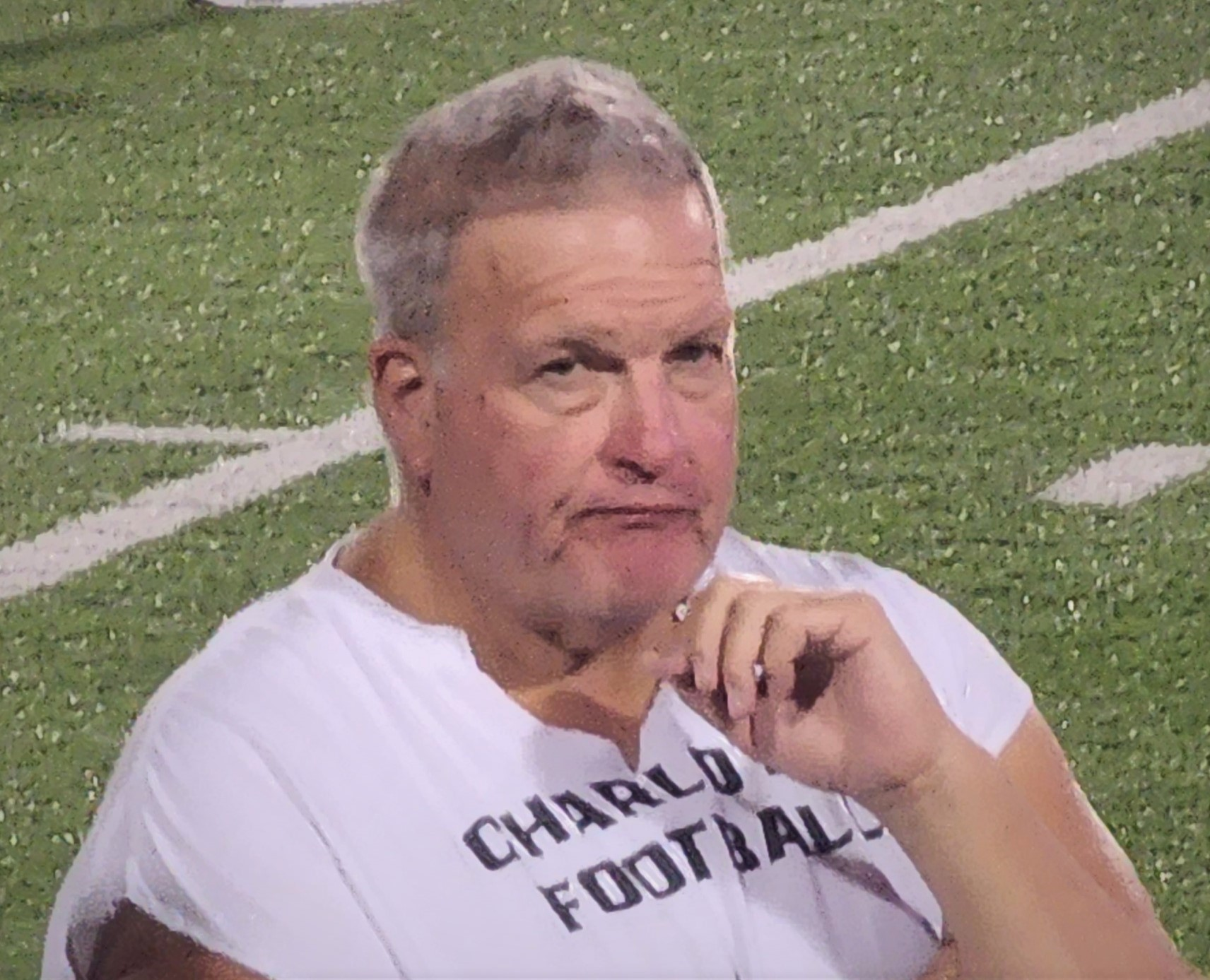
Biff Poggi

News was released on November 15, 2022 that Michigan associate head coach Francis "Biff" Poggi was named Charlotte's third head coach in the modern era. Poggi got his first win as an NCAA head coach against South Carolina St. in his first game leading the 49ers. Poggi recorded his first FBS and conference win on October 21 with a 10–7 road win over in-state rival ECU.

Charlotte fired Poggi on November 18, 2024, after a 3–7 start to the season. Poggi compiled a 6–16 record at the helm of the 49ers. Tim Brewster was named interim head coach for the final four games of the season.

=== Tim Albin era (2024–present) ===
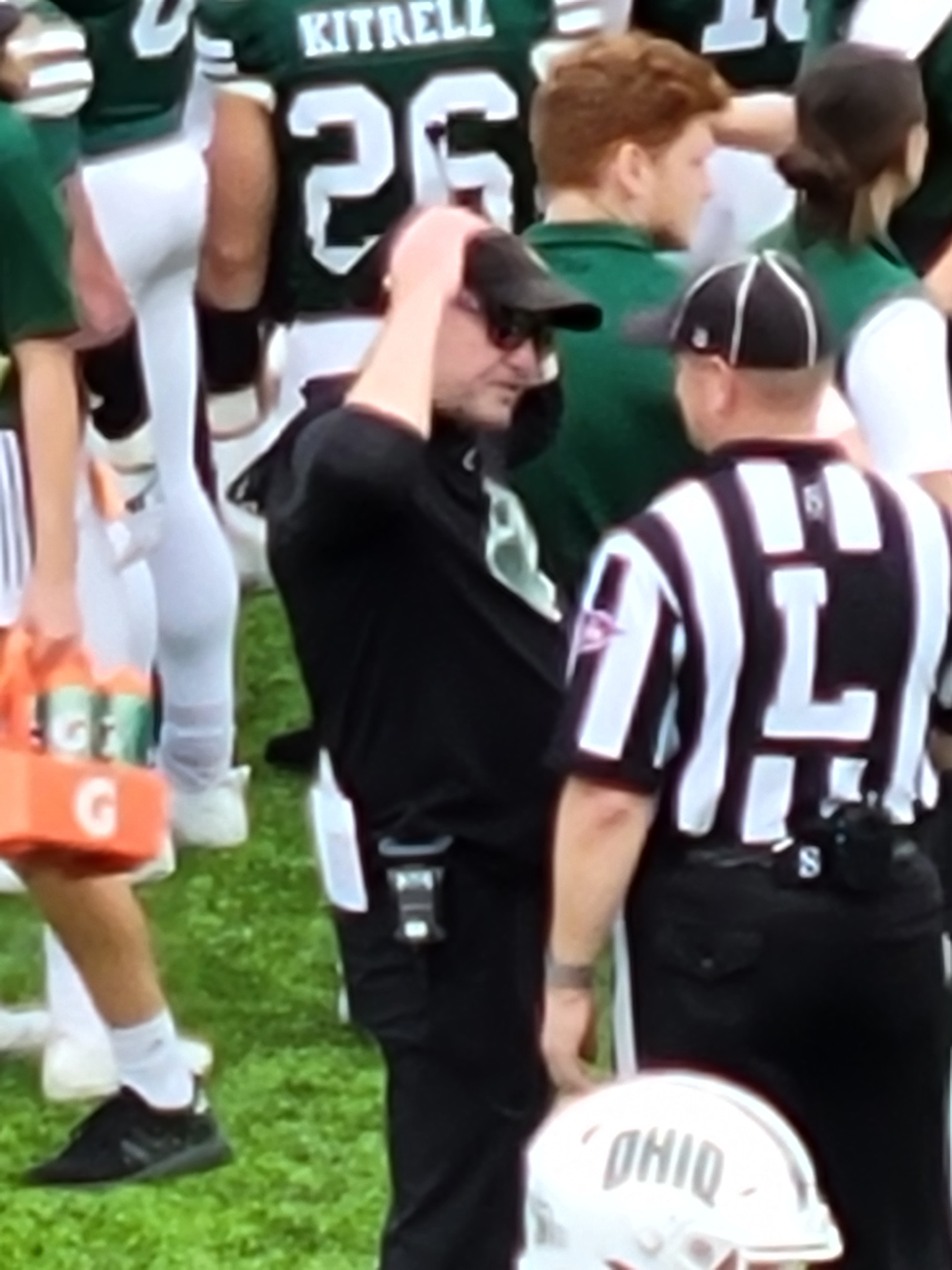
Tim Albin

Ohio head coach Tim Albin was named head coach of the 49ers on December 7, 2024, following the 2024 MAC Championship Game.

== Conference affiliations ==
- Independent (1946–1948)
- No team (1949–2012)
- FCS Independent (2013–2014)
- Conference USA (2015–2022)
- American Conference (2023–current)

== Bowl games ==
Charlotte has participated in one bowl game, and has a record of 0–1.

Season	Coach	Bowl	Opponent	Result
2019	Will Healy	Bahamas Bowl	Buffalo	L 9–31

== NFL draft picks ==
Charlotte has had 5 players selected in the NFL Draft as of the 2023 Draft.

Season	Player	Round	Overall	Team	NFL career notes (prior to 2022 NFL season)
2017	Larry Ogunjobi	3rd	65th	Cleveland Browns	21.5 Career Sacks; 2nd on Browns in Sacks in 2018 and 2019; 3rd on AFC Champion Bengals in Sacks in 2021
2019	Nate Davis	3rd	82nd	Tennessee Titans	Started 42 career games; Led Titans to 2020 AFC Championship Game
2020	Alex Highsmith	3rd	102nd	Pittsburgh Steelers	185 Career Tackles; 22.5 Career Sacks, 1 Interception, 14.5 Sacks in 2022 to lead the Steelers
2020	Cameron Clark	4th	129th	New York Jets	-
2023	Grant DuBose	7th	256th	Green Bay Packers	-

Additionally, Brandon Banks signed with the Washington Redskins and recorded one career tackle, and Austin Duke signed with the Carolina Panthers, as an undrafted free agent in 2017. Benny Lemay signed with the Indianapolis Colts as an undrafted free agent in 2020. Ben Deluca signed as an undrafted free agent in 2021 with the Chargers and participated in 3 games

== Head coaches ==
Coach	Tenure	Record	Pct.
Arthur Deremer	1946	2–4	.333
Marion Woods	1947	1–3	.250
Carol Blackwell	1948	0–5	.000
No Program (1949–2012)
Brad Lambert	2013–2018	22–48	.314
Will Healy	2018–2022	15–24	.385
Peter Rossomando*	2022	2–2	.500
Biff Poggi	2023–2024	6–16	.273
Tim Brewster*	2024	2–0	1.000
Tim Albin	2025–	1–14	.067

(*) Interim head coach

== Homecoming history ==
Since coming back as a program in 2013, the 49ers have had a Homecoming Game, generally held in the middle of the season. They have a 3–8 program record on Homecoming.

Year	Opponent	Result
2013	UNC Pembroke	L 22–45
2014	James Madison	L 40–48
2015	Southern Miss	L 10–44
2016	FIU	L 26–27
2017	UAB	W 25–24
2018	Western Kentucky	W 40–14
2019	Florida Atlantic	L 27–45
2020	No Homecoming Game	
2021	Rice	W 31–24 ^{OT}
2022	FIU	L 15–34
2023	Navy	L 0–14
2024	USF	L 24–59

== All-time record ==
Official record (including any NCAA imposed vacates and forfeits) against all current In-State NCAA Division I opponents.

=== Vs. In-State NCAA Division I teams ===
Team	Games Played	1st Meeting	Last Meeting	Next Meeting	Record (W-L)	Last Result	Streak
Appalachian State	3	Sept. 8, 2018	Sept. 12, 2020	Aug. 28, 2025	0–3	L 20–35 @ App. St.	Lost 3
Campbell*	2	Aug. 31, 2013	Aug. 28, 2014	NA	2–0	W 33–9 @ Campbell	Won 2
Davidson*	0	NA	NA	NA	0–0	NA	-
Duke	2	Oct. 31, 2020	Sept. 3, 2021	NA	1–1	W 31–28 @ Charlotte	Won 1
East Carolina°	1	Oct. 21, 2023	Oct. 5, 2024	2025	2–0	W 55–24 @ Charlotte	Won 2
Elon*	2	Sept. 20, 2014	Sept. 10, 2016	Sept. 11, 2027	1–1	W 47–14 @ Charlotte	Won 1
Gardner-Webb*	5	Oct. 5, 2013	Sep. 17, 2024	NA	4–1	W 27–26 @ Charlotte	Won 3
UNC	1	Sept. 7, 2024		Sept. 6, 2025	0–1	L 38-20 @ UNC	Lost 1
NC A&T*	1	Sept. 16, 2017	Sept. 16, 2017	NA	0–1	L 31–35 @ Charlotte	Lost 1
NC Central*	2	Sept. 7, 2013	Sept. 13, 2014	NA	1–1	W 40–28 @ NC Central	Won 1
NC State	0	Sept 7, 2030		Sept 6, 2031	0–0	2030	-
Wake Forest	0	NA	NA	NA	0–0	NA	-
Western Carolina*	0	NA	NA	NA	0–0	NA	-
Total	18	Aug. 31, 2013	Oct. 5, 2024		11–9	W 55–24 vs ECU	Won 1

(*)FCS Opponent (°)AAC Conference Opponent

=== Vs. AAC teams ===
Team	Games Played	1st Meeting	Last Meeting	Next Meeting	Record (W-L)	Last Result	Streak
Army	0	2025	NA	2025	0–0	@ Army	NA
East Carolina*	2	Oct. 21, 2023	Oct. 5, 2024	2025	2–0	W 55–24 @ Charlotte	Won 2
Florida Atlantic•	10	Sep. 26, 2015	Nov. 23, 2024	NA	3–7	W 39–27 @ FAU	Won 1
Memphis	2	Nov. 11, 2023	Oct. 26, 2025	NA	0–2	L 28-33 @ Memphis	Lost 2
Navy	2	Oct. 14, 2023	Oct. 19, 2025	NA	0–2	L 17-51 @ Navy	Lost 2
North Texas•	2	Oct. 26, 2019	Oct. 10, 2020	2025	2–0	W 49–21 @ N. Texas	Won 2
Rice•	6	Nov. 28, 2015	Sept. 28, 2024	2025	3–3	W 21–20 @ Rice	Won 1
SMU†	1	Sep. 30, 2023	NA	NA	0–1	L 16-34 @ SMU	Lost 1
Temple	2	Oct. 22, 2015°	Sep. 24, 2016°	2025	0–2	L 20–34 @ Temple	Lost 2
Tulane	1	Oct. 31, 2024	2025 @ Tulane	2025	0–1	L 3-34 @ Charlotte	Lost 1
Tulsa	1	Nov. 4, 2023	NA	NA	1–0	W 33-26^{OT} @ Tulsa	Won 1
UAB•	4	Nov. 21, 2017	Nov. 30, 2024	NA	2–2	W 29–27 @ Charlotte	Won 1
USF	2	Nov. 25, 2023	Nov. 16, 2024	2025	0–2	L 24-59 @ Charlotte	Lost 2
UTSA•	2	Nov. 21, 2015	Nov. 26, 2016	2025	0–2	L 14–33 @ UTSA	Lost 2
Total	37	Sep. 19, 2015	Nov. 30, 2024		13–24	W 29–27 vs UAB	Won 2

(*)Annual rival game, (°)Non-conference game, (•)Includes C-USA games, (†)No longer an AAC member

== Forty Niner seat licenses ==
To generate financial support for the launch of the football program, Chancellor Dubois created a program called Forty Niner Seat Licenses, or FSLs, which essentially served as seat deposits for season tickets. The Chancellor initially set forth a goal of 5,000 FSL reservations within 6 months. However, due to the tremendous level of support for the new program, the goal was met in only 2 months.

In February 2008, a fundraising capital campaign was established and led by prominent community leaders. These leaders included Mac Everett, Johnny Harris and Gene Johnson. Additionally, three other UNC Charlotte alumni were introduced as executive chairs: David Hauser, chief financial officer for Duke Energy Corporation; Bob Hull, chief financial officer for Lowe's Companies, Inc.; and Joe Price, chief financial officer for Bank of America Corporation.

Seat licenses are being sold in three tiers of seating: Green, Gold and White Gold. Green seat licenses are being sold at $1,000 per seat and will be located between the 30 yard line and the end zone; Gold seat licenses at $2,500 per seat and will be located between the 30 yard lines; and White Gold seat licenses at an undisclosed amount in a block of exclusive seating. Seat locations will be determined by the ticket holders' Charlotte 49ers Athletics Foundation rank which is determined by the amount of the cumulative financial contribution the donor has made to the foundation.

== Stadium ==
Chancellor Dubois conducted a lengthy review process of the committee's results before making his final recommendation to the board of trustees. He presented the findings of his own internal review to the board at a June meeting which included estimates from stadium design firm Populous. The estimates significantly increased facilities construction numbers from the feasibility committee figures. They were also significantly higher than those for a much larger facility recently constructed for the University of Central Florida's Bright House Stadium.

On February 12, 2010, the University of North Carolina's board of governors approved a debt service fee increase to fund the construction of the football stadium and football center, and on August 2, 2010 Governor Bev Perdue signed the debt service fee bill into law to clear the way for stadium construction. Designed by the architecture teams of Jenkins-Peer Architects and the DLR Group, its location was shown near the campus entrance at Highway 29 north of Hayes Stadium. On April 28, 2011 Charlotte held a groundbreaking ceremony for the football stadium. The stadium was completed in summer 2012. The 49ers' first game was a 52–7 win over Campbell on August 31, 2013.

== Future non-conference opponents ==
Announced schedules as of August 28, 2026.

2026	2027	2028	2029	2030	2031	2032
The Citadel	at Ole Miss	Charleston Southern	Wofford	Western Carolina	NC State	at Louisiana
at Ole Miss	Elon	at Michigan	at Ohio State	at NC State	Old Dominion	
at Appalachian State	Appalachian State	at Appalachian State	Appalachian State	Appalachian State		
Louisiana	at Old Dominion		at James Madison			

== Attendance ==
The largest crowd for a Charlotte football game at Jerry Richardson Stadium is 19,223, which was achieved on September 6, 2025, against North Carolina. The previous record was 19,151, set in 2018 against Appalachian State.

=== Single game attendance ===
Team	Date	Score	Attendance
North Carolina	September 6, 2025	L 3–20	19,223
Appalachian State	September 8, 2018	L 9–45	19,151
North Carolina A&T	September 16, 2017	L 31–35	18,651
Florida Atlantic	September 26, 2015	L 7–17	17,444
East Carolina	October 5, 2024	W 55–24	17,102
Gardner-Webb	September 14, 2024	W 27–26	16,715
Campbell	August 31, 2013	W 52–7	16,630
North Carolina Central	September 14, 2013	L 13–40	16,630
UNC Pembroke	October 12, 2013	L 22–45	16,630
Chowan Hawks	September 7, 2013	W 47–7	16,598

=== Attendance by season ===
Decade	Season	Games	Sellouts	Record (Pct.)	Attendance	Average	Best
2010's	2013	6	4	3–3 (.500)	93,244	15,540	16,630
2010's	2014	6	2	3–3 (.500)	79,632	13,272	15,875
2010's	2015	6	3	1–5 (.167)	87,603	14,606	17,444
2010's	2016	6	1	1–5 (.167)	85,154	14,192	15,807
2010's	2017	6	1	1–5 (.167)	71,420	11,903	18,651
2010's	2018	6	1	4–2 (.667)	70,263	11,710	19,151
2010's	2019	6	1	5–1 (.833)	73,924	12,321	16,119
Totals	2010's	42	13	18–24 (.429)	561,240	13,363	19,151
2020's	2020	2	0	1–1 (.500)	1,756†	878	1,042
2020's	2021	6	1	4–2 (.667)	79,753	13,292	16,050
2020's	2022	6	0	1–5 (.167)	65,439	10,907	13,940
2020's	2023	6	2	1–5 (.167)	74,828	12,471	15,659
2020's	2024	6	3	3–3 (.500)	84,820	14,137	17,102
Totals	2020's	26	6	10–16 (.385)	306,596	11,792	17,102
Totals	All-time	68	19	28–40 (.412)	867,836	12,762	19,151

Note:

† 2020 season attendance figures were affected by state and university quarantine decisions related to the COVID-19 pandemic. For specific details see the 2020 season page
