= 2015 Southern Miss Golden Eagles football team =

American college football season

2015 Southern Miss Golden Eagles football

C-USA West Division champion

C-USA Championship Game, L 28–45 vs. Western Kentucky

Heart of Dallas Bowl, L 31–44 vs. Washington
- Conference: Conference USA
- West Division
- Record: 9–5 (7–1 C-USA)
- Head coach: Todd Monken (3rd season)
- Offensive coordinator: Chip Lindsey (2nd season)
- Offensive scheme: Multiple
- Defensive coordinator: David Duggan (4th season)
- Base defense: 4–3
- Home stadium: M. M. Roberts Stadium

2015 Conference USA football standings
	Conf.			Overall
Team	W		L	W		L
East Division
No. 24 Western Kentucky x$	8	–	0	12	–	2
Middle Tennessee	6	–	2	7	–	6
Marshall	6	–	2	10	–	3
FIU	3	–	5	5	–	7
Old Dominion	3	–	5	5	–	7
Florida Atlantic	3	–	5	3	–	9
Charlotte*	0	–	8	2	–	10
West Division
Southern Miss x	7	–	1	9	–	5
Louisiana Tech	6	–	2	9	–	4
UTSA	3	–	5	3	–	9
UTEP	3	–	5	5	–	7
Rice	3	–	5	5	–	7
North Texas	1	–	7	1	–	11
Championship: Western Kentucky 45, Southern Miss 28
$ – Conference champion; x – Division champion/co-champions; * Ineligible for postseason bowl due to transition from FCS; As of January 12, 2015; Rankings from AP Poll

The 2015 Southern Miss Golden Eagles football team represented the University of Southern Mississippi in the 2015 NCAA Division I FBS football season as members of the West Division of Conference USA. They were led by third-year head coach Todd Monken and played their home games at M. M. Roberts Stadium in Hattiesburg, Mississippi. They finished the season 9–5, 7–1 in C-USA play to be champions of the West Division. They represented the West Division in the Conference USA Football Championship Game where they lost to Western Kentucky. They were invited to the Heart of Dallas Bowl, where they were defeated by Washington.

On January 24, 2016, head coach Todd Monken resigned to become the offensive coordinator and wide receivers coach for the Tampa Bay Buccaneers. He finished at Southern Miss with a three-year record of 13–25.

== Schedule ==
Southern Miss announced their 2015 football schedule on February 2, 2015. The schedule consisted of six home and away games in the regular season.

Date	Time	Opponent	Site	TV	Result	Attendance
September 5	9:00 p.m.	Mississippi State*	M. M. Roberts Stadium; Hattiesburg, MS	FS1	L 16–34	36,641
September 12	2:30 p.m.	Austin Peay*	M. M. Roberts Stadium; Hattiesburg, MS	ASN	W 52–6	23,042
September 19	6:00 p.m.	at Texas State*	Bobcat Stadium; San Marcos, TX	ESPN3	W 56–50	27,252
September 26	11:00 a.m.	at Nebraska*	Memorial Stadium; Lincoln, NE	ESPNews	L 28–36	89,899
October 3	6:00 p.m.	North Texas	M. M. Roberts Stadium; Hattiesburg, MS	FCS	W 49–14	26,430
October 9	6:00 p.m.	at Marshall	Joan C. Edwards Stadium; Huntington, WV	CBSSN	L 10–31	22,763
October 17	6:00 p.m.	UTSA^{†}	M. M. Roberts Stadium; Hattiesburg, MS	ASN	W 32–10	28,745
October 24	11:00 a.m.	at Charlotte	Jerry Richardson Stadium; Charlotte, NC	ASN	W 44–10	13,813
October 31	1:30 p.m.	UTEP	M. M. Roberts Stadium; Hattiesburg, MS	FCS	W 34–13	25,581
November 14	2:30 p.m.	at Rice	Rice Stadium; Houston, TX	ASN	W 65–10	18,656
November 21	2:30 p.m.	Old Dominion	M. M. Roberts Stadium; Hattiesburg, MS	ASN	W 56–31	29,568
November 28	11:00 a.m.	at Louisiana Tech	Joe Aillet Stadium; Ruston, LA (Rivalry in Dixie)	FSN	W 58–24	19,028
December 5	11:00 a.m.	at Western Kentucky	Houchens Industries–L. T. Smith Stadium; Bowling Green, KY (C–USA Championship Game)	ESPN2	L 28–45	16,823
December 26	1:20 p.m.	vs. Washington*	Cotton Bowl; Dallas, TX (Heart of Dallas Bowl)	ESPN	L 31–44	20,229
*Non-conference game; ^{†}Homecoming; All times are in Central time

== Game summaries ==
=== Mississippi State ===
Week One: Mississippi State Bulldogs at Southern Miss Golden Eagles – Game summary

Quarter	1	2	3	4	Total
Bulldogs	7	7	13	7	34
Golden Eagles	10	0	3	3	16

at M. M. Roberts Stadium, Hattiesburg, MS

- Date: September 5
- Game time: 9:00 p.m. CDT
- Game weather: 81° F • 11 mph • Rain
- Game attendance: 36,641
- Referee: David Smith
- TV: FS1
- Southern Miss vs Mississippi State

Game information

First quarter

- 5:39 Southern Miss – Stephen Brauchle 31 yard field goal, Southern Miss 3–0. Drive: 4 plays, -3 yards, 1:39
- 5:26 Mississippi State – Brandon Holloway 100 yard kickoff return (Westin Graves kick), Mississippi State 7–3. Drive: 0 plays, 0 yards, 0:00
- 2:20 Southern Miss – Jay'Shawn Washington 19 yard pass from Nick Mullens (Stephen Brauche kick), Southern Miss 10–7. Drive: 8 plays, 70 yards, 3:06

Second quarter

- 10:57 Mississippi State – Justin Johnson 5 yard pass from Dak Prescott (Westin Graves kick), Mississippi State 14–10. Drive: 5 plays, 21 yards, 1:28

Third quarter

- 12:15 Mississippi State – Gus Walley 4 yard pass from Dak Prescott (Westin Graves kick), Mississippi State 21–10. Drive: 9 plays, 95 yards, 2:45
- 10:36 Mississippi State – Westin Graves 38 yard field goal, Mississippi State 24–10. Drive: 6 plays, 19 yards, 1:22
- 8:37 Southern Miss – Stephen Brauchle 27 yard field goal, Mississippi State 24–13. Drive: 5 plays, 64 yards, 1:59
- 4:02 Mississippi State – Westin Graves 37 yard field goal, Mississippi State 27–13. Drive: 13 plays, 53 yards, 4:35

Fourth quarter

- 13:01 Southern Miss – Stephen Brauche 27 yard field goal, Mississippi State 27–16. Drive: 13 plays, 68 yards, 6:01
- 5:55 Mississippi State – Dak Prescott 7 yard run (Westin Graves kick), Mississippi State 34–16. Drive: 6 plays, 82 yards, 1:40

Leading Passers

- MSU – Dak Prescott, 22–38, 237 yards, 2 TD
- USM – Nick Mullens, 30–44, 311 yards, 1 TD, 2 INT

Leading Rushers

- MSU – Dak Prescott, 8 carries, 72 yards
- USM – Ito Smith, 8 carries, 69 yards

Leading Receivers

- MSU – Fred Ross, 5 receptions, 75 yards
- USM – Korey Robertson, 6 receptions, 81 yards

Leading Tacklers

- MSU – Richie Brown, 11 tackles
- USM – Picasso Nelson Jr., 5 tackles

=== Austin Peay ===
Week Two: Austin Peay Governors at Southern Miss Golden Eagles – Game summary

Quarter	1	2	3	4	Total
Governors	6	0	0	0	6
Golden Eagles	7	21	21	3	52

at M. M. Roberts Stadium, Hattiesburg, MS

- Date: September 12
- Game time: 2:30 p.m. CDT
- Game weather: 84° F • S 8 • Partly Cloudy
- Game attendance: 23,042
- Referee: Johnathan Noli
- TV: ASN
- Southern Miss vs Austin Peay

Game information

First quarter

- 5:36 Southern Miss – Mullens, Nick Mullens 2 yard run (Stephen Brauchle kick), Southern Miss 7–0. Drive: 3 plays, 6 yards, 1:07
- 3:01 Austin Peay – Rashaan Coleman 44 yard pass from Trey Taylor (Loga Birchfield kick failed), Southern Miss 7–6. Drive: 4 plays, 87 yards, 2:35

Second quarter

- 13:51 Southern Miss – Ito Smith 75 yard run (Stephen Brauchle kick), Southern Miss 14–6. Drive: 2 plays, 75 yards, 0:21
- 10:23 Southern Miss – D.J. Thompson 3 yard pass from Nick Mullens (Stephen Brauchle kick), Southern Miss 21–6. Drive: 6 plays, 72 yards, 1:52
- 7:37 Southern Miss – Korey Robertson 9 yard pass from Nick Mullens (Stephen Brauchle kick), Southern Miss 28–6. Drive: 4 plays, 40 yards, 1:02

Third quarter

- 9:23 Southern Miss – Ito Smith 49 yard pass from Nick Mullens (Stephen Brauchle kick), Southern Miss 35–6. Drive: 5 plays, 65 yards, 1:37
- 4:54 Southern Miss – Justice Hayes 1 yard run (Stephen Brauchle kick), Southern Miss 42–6. Drive: 7 plays, 56 yards, 2:10
- 1:23 Southern Miss – Kalan Reed 76 yard interception return (Parker Shaunfield kick), Southern Miss 49–6. Drive: 8 plays, 39 yards, 3:31

Fourth quarter

- 12:41 Southern Miss – Parker Shaunfield 28 yard field goal, Southern Miss 52–6. Drive: 5 plays, 28 yards, 1:47

Leading Passers

- APSU – Trey Taylor, 11–18, 93 yards, 1 TD, 1 INT
- USM – Nick Mullens, 22–40, 275 yards, 3 TD, 1 INT

Leading Rushers

- APSU – Kendall Morris, 17 carries, 54 yards
- USM – Ito Smith, 10 carries, 135 yards, 1 TD

Leading Receivers

- APSU – Rashaan Coleman, 2 receptions, 50 yards, 1 TD
- USM – Casey Martin, 7 receptions, 81 yards

Leading Tacklers

- APSU – DeKeivis Perry, 5 tackles
- USM – Dylan Bradley, 8 tackles, 2 sacks

=== @ Texas State ===
Week Three: Southern Miss Golden Eagles at Texas State Bobcats – Game summary

Quarter	1	2	3	4	Total
Golden Eagles	14	7	21	14	56
Bobcats	3	22	3	22	50

at Bobcat Stadium, San Marcos, TX

- Date: September 19
- Game time: 6:00 p.m. CDT
- Game weather: 92° F • E 7 • Mostly Sunny
- Game attendance: 27,252
- Referee: Kevin Stone
- TV: ESPN3
- Southern Miss vs Texas State

Game information

First quarter

- 11:47 Southern Miss – D.J. Thompson 23 yard pass from Nick Mullens (Parker Shaunfield kick), Southern Miss 7–0. Drive: 8 plays, 75 yards, 3:13
- 8:49 Texas State – Lumi Kaba 27 yard field goal, Southern Miss 7–3. Drive: 7 plays, 82 yards, 2:53
- 7:22 Southern Miss – Jordan Mitchell 19 yard pass from Nick Mullens (Parker Shaunfield kick), Southern Miss 14–3. Drive: 5 plays, 75 yards, 1:27

Second quarter

- 14:54 Southern Miss – Jalen Richard 1 yard run (Parker Shaunfield kick), Southern Miss 21–3. Drive: 13 plays, 65 yards, 6:03
- 13:41 Texas State – Tyler Jones 35 yard run (Lumi Kaba kick), Southern Miss 21–10. Drive: 4 plays, 69 yards, 1:08
- 2:00 Texas State – Lawrence White 3 yard pass from Tyler Jones (Robert Lowe pass from Jack Rhoades), Southern Miss 21–18. Drive: 10 plays, 64 yards, 3:28
- 0:34 Texas State – Demun Mercer 32 yard pass from Tyler Jones (Lumi Kaba kick), Texas State 25–21. Drive: 3 plays, 23 yards, 0:27

Third quarter

- 12:09 Southern Miss – Casey Martin 4 yard pass from Nick Mullens (Parker Shaunfield kick), Southern Miss 28–25. Drive: 5 plays, 58 yards, 0:58
- 5:56 Southern Miss – Jalen Richard 3 yard run (Parker Shaunfield kick), Southern Miss 35–25. Drive: 12 plays, 82 yards, 4:43
- 4:11 Texas State – Lumi Kaba 33 yard field goal, Southern Miss 35–28. Drive: 5 plays, 72 yards, 1:36
- 2:49 Southern Miss – Jalen Richard 53 yard run (Parker Shaunfield kick), Southern Miss 42–28. Drive: 4 plays, 75 yards, 1:22

Fourth quarter

- 13:36 Southern Miss – Casey Martin 50 yard pass from Nick Mullens (Parker Shaunfield kick), Southern Miss 49–28. Drive: 3 plays, 53 yards, 1:12
- 8:12 Texas State – Robert Lowe 2 yard run (Lumi Kaba kick), Southern Miss 49–35. Drive: 14 plays, 84 yards, 5:24
- 7:59 Texas State – Tyler Jones 54 yard run (Lumi Kaba kick), Southern Miss 49–42. Drive: 1 play, 54 yards, 0:13
- 6:23 Southern Miss – Jalen Richard 64 yard run (Parker Shaunfield kick), Southern Miss 56–42. Drive: 3 plays, 75 yards, 1:36
- 0:51 Texas State – Safety, Southern Miss 56–44. Drive: 4 plays, -1 yard, 1:06
- 0:04 Texas State – Demun Mercer 4 yard pass from Tyler Jones (Lumi Kaba kick failed), Southern Miss 56–50. Drive: 5 plays, 53 yards, 0:42

Leading Passers

- USM – Nick Mullens, 19–27, 333 yards, 4 TD
- TSU – Tyler Jones, 31–46, 310 yards, 3 TD

Leading Rushers

- USM – Jalen Richard, 27 carries, 230 yards, 4 TD
- TSU – Tyler Jones, 18 carries, 160 yards, 2 TD

Leading Receivers

- USM – Casey Martin, 5 receptions, 114 yards
- TSU – Jafus Gaines, 8 receptions, 78 yards

Leading Tacklers

- USM – D'Nerius Antoine, 9 tackles
- TSU – Trey McGowan, 11 tackles

=== @ Nebraska ===
Week Four: Southern Miss Golden Eagles at Nebraska Cornhuskers – Game summary

Quarter	1	2	3	4	Total
Golden Eagles	0	0	7	21	28
Cornhuskers	10	12	7	7	36

at Memorial Stadium, Lincoln, NE

- Date: September 26
- Game time: 11:00 a.m. CDT
- Game weather: 69° F • ENE 2 • Clear and sunny
- Game attendance: 89,899
- Referee: Tim O'Dey
- TV: ESPNews
- Southern Miss vs Nebraska

Game information

First quarter

- 9:57 Nebraska – Jordan Westerkamp 6 yard pass from Tommy Armstrong Jr. (Drew Brown kick), Nebraska 7–0. Drive: 8 plays, 71 yards, 3:35
- 4:24 Nebraska – Drew Brown 29 yard field goal, Nebraska 10–0. Drive: 8 plays, 49 yards, 4:03

Second quarter

- 10:49 Nebraska – Drew Brown 27 yard field goal, Nebraska 13–0. Drive: 11 plays, 70 yards, 5:02
- 5:31 Nebraska – Drew Brown 40 yard field goal, Nebraska 16–0. Drive: 5 plays, 46 yards, 2:22
- 1:34 Nebraska – Drew Brown 22 yard field goal, Nebraska 19–0. Drive: 5 plays, 43 yards, 1:57
- 0:00 Nebraska – Drew Brown 50 yard field goal, Nebraska 22–0. Drive: 5 plays, 19 yards, 0:34

Third quarter

- 13:19 Southern Miss – Ito Smith run for 17 yards (Parker Shaunfield kick), Nebraska 22–7. Drive: 2 plays, 25 yards, 0:48
- 0:27 Nebraska – Tommy Armstrong Jr. pass complete to Taariq Allen for 10 yards (Drew Brown kick), Nebraska 29–7. Drive: 11 plays, 93 yards, 4:04

Fourth quarter

- 13:34 Southern Miss – Casey Martin 21 yard pass from Nick Mullens (Parker Shaunfield kick), Nebraska 29–14. Drive: 6 plays, 78 yards, 1:47
- 12:26 Southern Miss – Casey Martin 19 yard pass from Nick Mullens (Parker Shaunfield kick), Nebraska 29–21. Drive: 5 plays, 53 yards, 1:06
- 9:30 Nebraska – Tommy Armstrong Jr. run for 16 yards (Drew Brown kick), Nebraska 36–21. Drive: 4 plays, 39 yards, 1:15
- 6:55 Southern Miss – Jalen Richard run for 1 yard (Parker Shaunfield kick), Nebraska 36–28. Drive: 7 plays, 75 yards, 2:35

Leading Passers

- USM – Nick Mullens, 26–41, 447 yards, 2 TD
- NEB – Tommy Armstrong, 23–35, 368 yards, 2 TD, 1 INT

Leading Rushers

- USM – Ito Smith, 7 carries, 29 yards, 1 TD
- NEB – Terrell Newby, 18 carries, 76 yards

Leading Receivers

- USM – Mike Thomas, 5 receptions, 121 yards
- NEB – Jordan Westerkamp, 11 receptions, 118 yards, 1 touchdown

Leading Tacklers

- USM – D'Nerius Antoine, 8 tackles
- NEB – Chris Weber, 12 tackles

=== North Texas ===
Week Five: North Texas Mean Green at Southern Miss Golden Eagles – Game summary

Quarter	1	2	3	4	Total
Mean Green	0	0	0	14	14
Golden Eagles	7	14	14	14	49

at M. M. Roberts Stadium, Hattiesburg, MS

- Date: October 3
- Game time: 6:00 p.m. CDT
- Game weather: 61° F • 9 mph • Overcast
- Game attendance: 26,430
- Referee: Javarro Edwards
- TV announcers (FCS): Mike Morgan (play-by-play) and J. C. Pearson (analyst)
- Southern Miss vs North Texas

Game information

First quarter

- 1:58 Southern Miss – Michael Thomas 5 yard pass from Nick Mullens (Parker Shaunfield kick), Southern Miss 7–0. Drive: 7 plays, 45 yards, 2:16

Second quarter

- 8:30 Southern Miss – Casey Martin 3 yard pass from Nick Mullens (Parker Shaunfield kick), Southern Miss 14–0. Drive: 9 plays, 59 yards, 3:30
- 5:46 Southern Miss – Nick Mullens run for 4 yards (Parker Shaunfield kick), Southern Miss 21–0. Drive: 4 plays, 60 yards, 1:34

Third quarter

- 8:55 Southern Miss – Mike Thomas 5 yard pass from Nick Mullens (Parker Shaunfield kick), Southern Miss 28–0. Drive: 9 plays, 80 yards, 2:36
- 6:35 Southern Miss – Mike Thomas for 62 yard pass from Nick Mullens (Parker Shaunfield kick), Southern Miss 35–0. Drive: 1 play, 62 yards, 0:11

Fourth quarter

- 14:45 North Texas – Andrew McNulty pass complete to Carlos Harris 23 yard pass from Andrew McNulty (Trevor Moore kick), Southern Miss 35–7. Drive: 7 plays, 81 yards, 0:59
- 9:58 Southern Miss – Ito Smith 4 yard run (Parker Shaunfield kick), Southern Miss 42–7. Drive: 10 plays, 75 yards, 4:47
- 6:35 Southern Miss – Justice Hayes 2 yards run (Parker Shaunfield kick), Southern Miss 49–7. Drive: 3 plays, 66 yards, 2:02
- 4:03 North Texas – Willy Ivery 3 yard run (Trevor Moore kick), Southern Miss 49–14. Drive: 7 plays, 60 yards, 2:32

Leading Passers

- UNT – Andrew McNulty, 11–21, 131 yards, 1 TD
- USM – Nick Mullens, 27–36, 325 yards, 4 TD

Leading Rushers

- UNT – Jeffrey Wilson, 22 carries, 136 yards
- USM – Justice Hayes, 16 carries, 86 yards, 1 TD

Leading Receivers

- UNT – Carlos Harris, 9 receptions, 136 yards, 1 TD
- USM – Mike Thomas, 7 receptions, 155 yards, 3 TD

Leading Tacklers

- UNT – James Gray, 7 tackles
- USM – Picasso Nelson Jr., 7 tackles

=== @ Marshall ===
Week Six: Southern Miss Golden Eagles at Marshall Thundering Herd – Game summary

Quarter	1	2	3	4	Total
Golden Eagles	7	3	0	0	10
Thundering Herd	7	10	14	0	31

at Joan C. Edwards Stadium, Huntington, WV

- Date: October 9
- Game time: 6:00 p.m. CDT
- Game weather: 66° F • SW 3 • Mostly Cloudy
- Game attendance: 22,763
- Referee: Tra Blake
- TV: CBSSN
- Southern Miss vs Marshall

Game information

First quarter

- 6:08 Southern Miss – Michael Thomas 6 yard pass from Nick Mullens (Parker Shaunfield kick), Southern Miss 7–0. Drive: 9 plays, 89 yards, 4:35
- 3:05 Marshall – Devon Johnson 1 yard run (Nick Smith kick), Tied 7–7. Drive: 7 plays, 37 yards, 3:03

Second quarter

- 11:55 Southern Miss – Parker Shaunfield 33 yard field goal, Southern Miss 10–7. Drive: 6 plays, 31 yards, 0:48
- 8:36 Marshall – Nick Smith 34 yard field goal, Tied 10–10. Drive: 6 plays, 35 yards, 3:19
- 0:25 Marshall – Ryan Yurachek 3 yard pass from Chase Litton (Nick Smith kick), Marshall 17–10. Drive: 9 plays, 67 yards, 4:00

Third quarter

- 7:58 Marshall – Deandre Reaves 61 yard pass from Chase Litton (Nick Smith kick), Marshall 24–10. Drive: 4 plays, 70 yards, 1:43
- 1:49 Marshall – Jarquez Samuel 3 yard fumble return (Nick Smith kick), Marshall 31–10. Drive: 3 plays, -4 yards, 1:19

Leading Passers

- USM – Nick Mullens, 29–58, 314 yards, 1 TD, 1 INT
- MU – Chase Litton, 11–21, 163 yards, 2 TD, 1 INT

Leading Rushers

- USM – Jalen Richard, 16 carries, 87 yards
- MU – Devon Johnson, 22 carries, 82 yards, 1 TD

Leading Receivers

- USM – Casey Martin, 9 receptions, 85 yards
- MU – Davonte Allen, 5 receptions, 57 yards

Leading Tacklers

- USM – Brian Anderson, 11 tackles
- MU – Evan McKelvey, 10 tackles

=== UTSA ===
Week Seven: UTSA Roadrunners at Southern Miss Golden Eagles – Game summary

Quarter	1	2	3	4	Total
Roadrunners	0	0	10	0	10
Golden Eagles	7	9	10	6	32

at M. M. Roberts Stadium, Hattiesburg, MS

- Date: October 17
- Game time: 6:00 p.m. CDT
- Game weather: 59° F • Clear
- Game attendance: 28,745
- Referee: Tra Blake
- TV: CBSSN
- Southern Miss vs UTSA

Game information

First quarter

- 12:35 Southern Miss – Michael Thomas 47 yard pass from Nick Mullens (Stephen Brauchle kick), Southern Miss 7–0. Drive: 4 plays, 70 yards, 1:26

Second quarter

- 8:38 Southern Miss – Stephen Brauchle 25 yard field goal, Southern Miss 10–0. Drive: 8 plays, 75 yards, 3:30
- 1:37 Southern Miss – Stephen Brauchle 22 yard field goal, Southern Miss 13–0. Drive: 8 plays, 75 yards, 2:47
- 0:00 Southern Miss – Stephen Brauchle 20 yard field goal, Southern Miss 16–0. Drive: 6 plays, 58 yards, 1:01

Third quarter

- 10:37 Southern Miss – D.J. Thompson 5 yard pass from Nick Mullens (Stephen Brauchle kick), Southern Miss 23–0. Drive: 11 plays, 75 yards, 4:23
- 8:56 Southern Miss – Stephen Brauchle 39 yard field goal, Southern Miss 26–0. Drive: 4 plays, 5 yards, 1:32
- 5:53 Texas–San Antonio – Kerry Thomas Jr. 1 yard pass from Dalton Sturm (Daniel Portillo kick), Southern Miss 26–7. Drive: 8 plays, 64 yards, 3:03
- 1:22 Texas–San Antonio – Daniel Portillo 30 yard field goal, Southern Miss 26–10. Drive: 10 plays, 34 yards, 3:22

Fourth quarter

- 13:06 Southern Miss – Jalen Richard 1 yard run (Stephen Brauchle kick failed), Southern Miss 32–10. Drive: 7 plays, 75 yards, 3:16

Leading Passers

- UTSA – Dalton Sturm, 6–22, 66 yards, 1 TD
- USM – Nick Mullens, 23–31, 343 yards, 2 TD, 3 INT

Leading Rushers

- UTSA – Jarveon Williams, 16 carries, 88 yards
- USM – Jalen Richard, 25 carries, 115 yards, 1 TD

Leading Receivers

- UTSA – Kerry Thomas Jr., 3 receptions, 31 yards, 1 TD
- USM – DJ Thompson, 6 receptions, 141 yards, 1 TD

Leading Tacklers

- UTSA – Duke Wheeler, 11 tackles
- USM – Brian Anderson, 6 tackles, 2 sacks

=== @ Charlotte ===
Week Eight: Southern Miss Golden Eagles at Charlotte 49ers – Game summary

Quarter	1	2	3	4	Total
Golden Eagles	10	13	14	7	44
49ers	3	0	7	0	10

at Jerry Richardson Stadium, Charlotte, NC

- Date: October 24
- Game time: 11:00 a.m. CDT
- Game weather: 68° F • 5 mph • Partly Cloudy
- Game attendance: 13,813
- Referee: Stephen Lamanti
- TV: ASN
- Southern Miss vs Charlotte

Game information

First quarter

- 7:19 Charlotte – Blake Brewer 25 yard field goal, Charlotte 3–0. Drive: 10 plays, 59 yards, 3:08
- 5:49 Southern Miss – Michael Thomas 69 yard pass from Nick Mullens (Stephen Brauchle kick), Southern Miss 7–3. Drive: 3 plays, 77 yards, 1:30
- 3:47 Southern Miss – Stephen Brauche 38 yard field goal, Southern Miss 10–3. Drive: 4 plays, 6 yards, 0:48

Second quarter

- 7:49 Southern Miss – Taylor Marini 9 yard pass from Nick Mullens (Stephen Brauchle kick failed), Southern Miss 16–3. Drive: 8 plays, 59 yards, 2:43
- 1:44 Southern Miss – Korey Robertson 4 yard pass from Nick Mullens (Stephen Brauchle kick), Southern Miss 23–3. Drive: 9 plays, 80 yards, 3:32

Third quarter

- 8:29 Southern Miss – Casey Martin 4 yard pass from Nick Mullens (Stephen Brauchle kick), Southern Miss 30–3. Drive: 14 plays, 72 yards, 6:31
- 5:54 Charlotte – Lee McNeill 20 yard run (Blake Brewer kick), Southern Miss 30–10. Drive: 7 plays, 75 yards, 2:35
- 5:41 Southern Miss – Jalen Richard 95 yard kickoff return (Stephen Brauchle kick), Southern Miss 37–10. Drive: 0 plays, 0 yards, 0:00

Fourth quarter

- 13:56 Southern Miss – Jalen Richard 7 yard run (Stephen Brauchle kick), Southern Miss 44–10. Drive: 1 play, 2 yards, 0:03

Leading Passers

- USM – Nick Mullens, 24–38, 265 yards, 4 TD
- UNCC – Lee McNeill, 10–27, 93 yards, 2 INT

Leading Rushers

- USM – Richard Jalen, 13 carries, 114 yards, 1 TD
- UNCC – Kalif Phillips, 17 carries, 71 yards

Leading Receivers

- USM – Casey Martin, 8 receptions, 54 yards, 1 TD
- UNCC – Trent Bostick, 3 rceptions, 43 yards

Leading Tacklers

- USM – D'Nerius Antione, 9 tackles
- UNCC – Nick Cook, 8 tackles

=== UTEP ===
Week Nine: UTEP Miners at Southern Miss Golden Eagles – Game summary

Quarter	1	2	3	4	Total
Miners	0	3	3	7	13
Golden Eagles	7	6	7	14	34

at M. M. Roberts Stadium, Hattiesburg, MS

- Date: October 31
- Game time: 1:30 p.m. CDT
- Game weather: 67° F • 7 mph • Overcast, Rainy 1-hour, 6-minute weather delay.
- Game attendance: 25,581
- Referee: Joe Pester
- TV: FCS
- Southern Miss vs UTEP

Game information

First quarter

- 10:50 Southern Miss – Michael Thomas 11 yard pass from Nick Mullens (Stephen Brauchle kick), Southern Miss 7–0. Drive: 8 plays, 63 yards, 3:09

Second quarter

- 12:45 Texas–El Paso – Jay Mattox 38 yard field goal, Southern Miss 7–3. Drive: 17 plays, 77 yards, 8:49
- 0:15 Southern Miss – Jalen Richard 9 yard pass from Nick Mullens (Tyler Sarrazin rush failed), Southern Miss 13–3. Drive: 3 plays, 68 yards, 0:33

Third quarter

- 9:27 Southern Miss – D.J. Thompson 27 yard pass from Nick Mullens (Stephen Brauchle kick), Southern Miss 20–3. Drive: 5 plays, 93 yards, 1:30
- 4:11 Texas–El Paso – Jay Mattox 26 yard field goal, Southern Miss 20–6. Drive: 11 plays, 69 yards, 5:16

Fourth quarter

- 14:54 Southern Miss – D.J. Thompson 10 yard pass from Nick Mullens (Stephen Brauchle kick), Southern Miss 27–6. Drive: 9 plays, 75 yards, 4:17
- 10:09 Texas–El Paso – LaQuintus Dowell 1 yard run (Jay Mattox kick), Southern Miss 27–13. Drive: 9 plays, 57 yards, 4:45
- 6:45 Southern Miss – Tyler Sarrazin 8 yard run (Stephen Brauchle kick), Southern Miss 34–13. Drive: 9 plays, 75 yards, 3:24

Leading Passers

- UTEP – Mack Leftwich, 16–32, 197 yards
- USM – Nick Mullens, 23–33, 277 yards, 4 TDs

Leading Rushers

- UTEP – LaQuintus Dowell, 17 carries, 52 yards, 1 TD
- USM – Jalen Richard, 20 carries, 127 yards

Leading Receivers

- UTEP – Jeremiah Laufusa, 3 receptions, 54 yards
- USM – D.J. Thompson, 10 receptions, 112 yards, 2 TDs

Leading Tacklers

- UTEP – Alvin Jones, 8 tackles
- USM – Kalan Reed, 9 tackles

=== @ Rice ===
Week Eleven: Southern Miss Golden Eagles at Rice Owls – Game summary

Quarter	1	2	3	4	Total
Golden Eagles	7	35	10	13	65
Owls	0	0	0	10	10

at Rice Stadium, Houston, TX

- Date: November 14
- Game time: 2:30 p.m. CST
- Game weather: 71° F • N 5 • Clear
- Game attendance: 18,656
- Referee: Daniel Gautreau
- TV: ASN
- Southern Miss vs Rice

Game information

First quarter

- 3:13 Southern Miss – Ito Smith 28 yard pass from Nick Mullens (Stephen Brauchle kick), Southern Miss 7–0. Drive: 9 plays, 68 yards, 3:55

Second quarter

- 9:22 Southern Miss – Xavier Thigpen 6 yard pass from Tyler Sarrazin (Stephen Brauchle kick), Southern Miss 14–0. Drive: 10 plays, 52 yards, 3:12
- 7:30 Southern Miss – Michael Thomas 50 yard pass from Nick Mullens (Stephen Brauchle kick), Southern Miss 21–0. Drive: 3 plays, 51 yards, 0:53
- 6:08 Southern Miss – Michael Thomas 51 yard pass from Nick Mullens (Stephen Brauchle kick), Southern Miss 28–0. Drive: 2 plays, 62 yards, 0:19
- 5:04 Southern Miss – DJ Thompson 13 yard pass from Nick Mullens (Stephen Brauchle kick), Southern Miss 35–0. Drive: 1 play, 13 yards, 0:06
- 0:30 Southern Miss – Ito Smith 16 yard pass from Nick Mullens (Stephen Brauchle kick), Southern Miss 42–0. Drive: 8 plays, 95 yards, 2:44

Third quarter

- 13:02 Southern Miss – Jalen Richard 60 yard run (Stephen Brauchle kick), Southern Miss 49–0. Drive: 4 plays, 73 yards, 1:58
- 7:53 Southern Miss – Stephen Brauchle 39 yard field goal, Southern Miss 52–0. Drive: 9 plays, 65 yards, 4:09

Fourth quarter

- 14:54 Southern Miss – Tyler Matthews 17 yard run (Stephen Brauchle PAT blocked), Southern Miss 58–0. Drive: 6 plays, 79 yards, 2:59
- 11:10 Rice – Hayden Tobola 33 yard field goal, Southern Miss 58–3. Drive: 4 plays, 0 yards, 0:25
- 9:45 Southern Miss – Jarell Aaron 47 yard pass from Tyler Matthews (Parker Shaunfield kick), Southern Miss 65–3. Drive: 4 plays, 75 yards, 1:25
- 4:46 Rice – Nate German 20 yard pass from Driphus Jackson (Hayden Tobola kick), Southern Miss 65–10. Drive: 10 plays, 77 yards, 4:59

Leading Passers

- USM – Nick Mullens, 23–31, 386 yards, 5 TD
- RU – Driphus Jackson, 8–19, 69 yards, 1 TD

Leading Rushers

- USM – Jalen Richard, 6 carries, 78 yards, 1 TD
- RU – Darik Dillard, 9 carries, 70 yards

Leading Receivers

- USM – Michael Thomas, 5 receptions, 126 yards, 2 TD
- RU – Parker Smith, 3 receptions, 40 yards

Leading Tacklers

- USM – D'Nerius Antoine, 7 tackles
- RU – Alex Lyons, 8 tackles

=== Old Dominion ===
Week Twelve: Old Dominion Monarchs at Southern Miss Golden Eagles – Game summary

Quarter	1	2	3	4	Total
Monarchs	7	10	14	0	31
Golden Eagles	14	0	28	14	56

at M. M. Roberts Stadium, Hattiesburg, MS

- Date: November 21
- Game time: 2:30 p.m. CST
- Game weather: 64° F • Overcast
- Game attendance: 29,568
- Referee: S. LaMantia
- TV: ASN
- Southern Miss vs Old Dominion

Game information

First quarter

- 8:19 Southern Miss – Jalen Richard 1 yard run (Stephen Brauchle kick), Southern Miss 7–0. Drive: 6 plays, 45 yards, 2:20
- 4:11 Old Dominion – Martez Simpson 33 yard fumble return (Chris Kirtley kick), Tied 7–7. Drive: 7 plays, 10 yards, 2:29
- 2:38 Southern Miss – Casey Martin 34 yard pass from Nick Mullens (Stephen Brauchle kick), Southern Miss 14–7. Drive: 4 plays, 67 yards, 1:33

Second quarter

- 13:05 Old Dominion – Zach Pascal 16 yard pass from Shuler Bentley (Chris Kirtley kick), Tied 14–14. Drive: 10 plays, 65 yards, 4:33
- 0:00 Old Dominion – Chris Kirtley 25 yard field goal, Old Dominion 17–14. Drive: 17 plays, 77 yards, 2:26

Third quarter

- 12:53 Southern Miss – Michael Thomas 24 yard pass from Nick Mullens (Stephen Brauchle kick), Southern Miss 21–17. Drive: 5 plays, 67 yards, 2:07
- 8:46 Old Dominion – Jonathan Duhart 11 yard pass from Shuler Bentley (Chris Kirtley kick), Old Dominion 24–21. Drive: 8 plays, 83 yards, 4:07
- 7:30 Old Dominion – Jonathan Duhart 64 yard pass from Shuler Bentley (Chris Kirtley kick), Old Dominion 31–21. Drive: 1 play, 64 yards, 0:11
- 5:51 Southern Miss – Ito Smith 19 yard run (Stephen Brauchle kick), Old Dominion 31–28. Drive: 5 plays, 71 yards, 1:39
- 1:34 Southern Miss – Jalen Richard 10 yard run (Stephen Brauchle kick), Southern Miss 35–31. Drive: 8 plays, 29 yards, 4:00
- 1:16 Southern Miss – Jalen Richard 4 yard run (Stephen Brauchle kick), Southern Miss 42–31. Drive: 1 play, 4 yards, 0:05

Fourth quarter

- 14:11 Southern Miss – Nick Mullens 9 yard run (Stephen Brauchle kick), Southern Miss 49–31. Drive: 4 plays, 71 yards, 1:03
- 9:03 Southern Miss – Jalen Richard 54 yard run (Stephen Brauchle kick), Southern Miss 56–31. Drive: 2 plays, 58 yards, 0:32

Leading Passers

- ODU – Shuler Bentley, 22-41, 228 yards, 3 TD, 1 INT
- USM – Nick Mullens, 21-37, 302 yards, 2 TD, 1 INT

Leading Rushers

- ODU – Jeremy Cox, 21 carries, 98 yards
- USM – Jeremy Richard, 22 carries, 161 yards, 4 TD

Leading Receivers

- ODU – Jonathan Duhart, 9 receptions, 134 yards, 2 TD
- USM – Casey Martin, 8 receptions, 104 yards, 1 TD

Leading Tacklers

- ODU – Martez Simpson, 11 tackles
- USM – Brian Anderson, 12 tackles

=== @ Louisiana Tech ===
Week Thirteen: Southern Miss Golden Eagles at Louisiana Tech Bulldogs – Game summary

Quarter	1	2	3	4	Total
Golden Eagles	7	17	7	27	58
Bulldogs	3	7	7	7	24

at Joe Aillet Stadium, Ruston, LA

- Date: November 28
- Game time: 11:00 a.m. CST
- Game weather: 58° F • NW 10 • Light Rain
- Game attendance: 19,028
- Referee: Joe Pester
- Southern Miss vs Louisiana Tech

Game information

First quarter

- 8:17 Southern Miss – Jalen Richard 22 yard pass from Nick Mullens (Stephen Brauchle kick), Southern Miss 7–0. Drive: 7 plays, 92 yards, 2:41
- 4:33 Louisiana Tech – Jonathan Barnes 47 yard field goal, Southern Miss 7–3. Drive: 10 plays, 28 yards, 3:44

Second quarter

- 12:06 Southern Miss – Jalen Richard 1 yard run (Stephen Brauchle kick), Southern Miss 14–3. Drive: 8 plays, 70 yards, 3:03
- 10:06 Southern Miss – Michael Thomas 7 yard pass from Nick Mullens (Stephen Brauchle kick), Southern Miss 21–3. Drive: 6 plays, 54 yards, 2:00
- 4:10 Southern Miss – Stephen Brauchle 21 yard field goal, Southern Miss 24–3. Drive: 4 plays, 3 yards, 0:59
- 1:44 Louisiana Tech – Kenneth Dixon 22 yard pass from Jeff Driskel (Jonathan Barnes kick), Southern Miss 24–10. Drive: 7 plays, 75 yards, 2:26

Third quarter

- 5:11 Louisiana Tech – Kenneth Dixon 43 yard pass from Jeff Driskel (Jonathan Barnes kick), Southern Miss 24–17. Drive: 7 plays, 75 yards, 2:47
- 2:09 Southern Miss – Korey Robertson 1 yard pass from Nick Mullens (Stephen Brauchle kick), Southern Miss 31–17. Drive: 7 plays, 74 yards, 3:02

Fourth quarter

- 14:41 Southern Miss – Ito Smith 57 yard run (Stephen Brauchle kick), Southern Miss 38–17. Drive: 1 play, 57 yards, 0:09
- 14:20 Southern Miss – Ito Smith 17 yard run (Stephen Brauchle PAT missed), Southern Miss 44–17. Drive: 1 play, 17 yards, 0:02
- 13:56 Southern Miss – Ito Smith 11 yard run (Stephen Brauchle kick), Southern Miss 51–17. Drive: 1 play, 11 yards, 0:08
- 10:23 Louisiana Tech – Trent Taylor 19 yard pass from Jeff Driskel (Jonathan Barnes kick), Southern Miss 51–24. Drive: 11 plays, 79 yards, 3:33
- 4:26 Southern Miss – Devonta Foster 26 yard interception return (Stephen Brauchle kick), Southern Miss 58–24. Drive: 3 plays, 6 yards, 0:45

Leading Passers

- USM – Nick Mullens, 24–37, 386 yards, 3 TD, 1 INT
- LTU – Jeff Driskel, 27–44, 355 yards, 3 TD, 3 INT

Leading Rushers

- USM – Ito Smith, 22 carries, 169 yards, 3 TD
- LTU – Paul Turner, 1 carry, 7 yards

Leading Receivers

- USM – Michael Thomas, 7 receptions, 162 yards, 1 TD
- LTU – Paul Turner, 6 receptions, 112 yards

Leading Tacklers

- USM – D'Nerius Antoine, 7 tackles
- LTU – Beau Fitte, 15 tackles

=== @ Western Kentucky (C–USA Championship game) ===
C–USA Championship Game: Southern Miss Golden Eagles at Western Kentucky – Game summary

Quarter	1	2	3	4	Total
Golden Eagles	7	14	7	0	28
Hilltoppers	7	14	10	14	45

at Houchens Industries–L. T. Smith Stadium, Bowling Green, KY

- Date: December 5
- Game time: 11:00 a.m. CST
- Game weather: 47° F • SE 2 • Mostly Sunny
- Game attendance: 16,823
- Referee: Ken Antee
- TV: ESPN2
- Southern Miss vs Western Kentucky

Game information

First quarter

- 12:29 Western Kentucky – Antwane Grant 5 yard pass from Brandon Doughty (Garrett Schwettman kick), Western Kentucky 7–0. Drive: 5 plays, 28 yards, 1:31
- 6:56 Southern Miss – Jalen Richard 2 yard run (Stephen Brauchle kick), Tied 7–7. Drive: 5 plays, 45 yards, 1:48

Second quarter

- 11:26 Southern Miss – Michael Thomas 5 yard pass from Nick Mullens (Stephen Brauchle kick), Southern Miss 14–7. Drive: 6 plays, 32 yards, 2:15
- 9:46 Southern Miss – Kalan Reed 40 yard interception return (Stephen Brauchle kick), Southern Miss 21–7. Drive: 5 plays, 22 yards, 1:40
- 2:52 Western Kentucky – Brandon Doughty 3 yard run (Garrett Schwettman kick), Southern Miss 21–14. Drive: 19 plays, 75 yards, 6:54
- 0:11 Western Kentucky – Taywan Taylor 2 yard pass from Brandon Doughty (Garrett Schwettman kick), Tied 21–21. Drive: 7 plays, 97 yards, 1:00

Third quarter

- 12:04 Southern Miss – Ito Smith 37 yard run (Stephen Brauchle kick), Southern Miss 28–21. Drive: 5 plays, 71 yards, 1:58
- 6:21 Western Kentucky – Garrett Schwettman 37 yard field goal, Southern Miss 28–24. Drive: 8 plays, 39 yards, 1:27
- 1:19 Western Kentucky – Taywan Taylor 39 yard pass from Brandon Doughty (Garrett Schwettman kick), Western Kentucky 31–28. Drive: 5 plays, 67 yards, 2:16

Fourth quarter

- 13:57 Western Kentucky – D'Andre Ferby 3 yard run (Garrett Schwettman kick), Western Kentucky 38–28. Drive: 3 plays, 58 yards, 0:56
- 5:01 Western Kentucky – D'Andre Ferby 2 yard run (Garrett Schwettman kick), Western Kentucky 45–28. Drive: 11 plays, 82 yards, 7:23

Leading Passers

- USM – Nick Mullens, 15–30, 181 yards, 1 TD, 3 INT
- WKU – Brandon Doughty, 34–52, 410 yards, 3 TD, 1 INT

Leading Rushers

- USM – Ito Smith, 15 carries, 105 yards, 1 TD
- WKU – DeAndre Ferby, 21 carries, 57 yards, 2 TD

Leading Receivers

- USM – Michael Thomas, 6 receptions, 90 yards, 1 TD
- WKU – Taywan Taylor, 8 receptions, 165 yards, 2 TD

Leading Tacklers

- USM – Cornell Armstrong, 10 tackles
- WKU – Branden Leston, 7 tackles

=== Vs. Washington (Heart of Dallas Bowl) ===
Heart of Dallas Bowl: Southern Miss Golden Eagles vs. Washington Huskies – Game summary

Quarter	1	2	3	4	Total
Huskies	14	7	10	13	44
Golden Eagles	7	10	7	7	31

at Cotton Bowl, Dallas, TX

- Date: December 26
- Game time: 1:20 p.m. CST
- Game weather: 78° F • SSE 21 • Cloudy
- Game attendance: 20,229
- Referee: Micheal Roche
- TV: ESPN
- Southern Miss vs Washington (Heart of Dallas Bowl)

Game information

First quarter

- 5:16 Washington – Myles Gaskin 2 yard run (Cameron Van Winkle kick), Washington 7–0. Drive: 12 plays, 63 yards, 5:09
- 3:33 Southern Miss – Michael Thomas 56 yard pass from Nick Mullens (Stephen Brauchle kick), Tied 7–7. Drive: 4 plays, 54 yards, 1:43
- 0:56 Washington – Myles Gaskin 1 yard run (Cameron Van Winkle kick), Washington 14–7. Drive: 6 plays, 75 yards, 2:37

Second quarter

- 10:56 Southern Miss – Stephen Brauchle 22 yard field goal, Washington 14–10. Drive: 13 plays, 73 yards, 5:00
- 9:02 Washington – Jaydon Mickens 29 yard run (Cameron Van Winkle kick), Washington 21–10. Drive: 5 plays, 65 yards, 1:54
- 1:15 Southern Miss – Ito Smith 1 yard run (Stephen Brauchle kick), Washington 21–17. Drive: 8 plays, 80 yards, 0:55

Third quarter

- 8:23 Washington – Cameron Van Winkle 24 yard field goal, Washington 24–17. Drive: 10 plays, 56 yards, 4:09
- 2:47 Southern Miss – Ito Smith 2 yard run (Stephen Brauchle kick), Tied 24–24. Drive: 7 plays, 57 yards, 2:43
- 2:26 Washington – Myles Gaskin 86 yard run (Cameron Van Winkle kick), Washington 31–24. Drive: 1 play, 86 yards, 0:21

Fourth quarter

- 14:15 Washington – Cameron Van Winkle 21 yard field goal, Washington 34–24. Drive: 7 plays, 21 yards, 2:17
- 7:53 Washington – Myles Gaskin 13 yard run (Cameron Van Winkle kick), Washington 41–24. Drive: 9 plays, 74 yards, 4:51
- 5:22 Southern Miss – Michael Thomas 27 yard pass from Nick Mullens (Stephen Brauchle kick), Washington 41–31. Drive: 8 plays, 65 yards, 2:31
- 0:13 Washington – Cameron Van Winkle 23 yard field goal, Washington 44–31. Drive: 10 plays, 45 yards, 5:09

Leading Passers

- WASH – Jake Browning, 23–34, 284 yards
- USM – Nick Mullens, 25–38, 331 yards, 2 TD

Leading Rushers

- WASH – Myles Gaskin, 26 carries, 181 yards, 4 TD
- USM – Ito Smith, 16 carries, 40 yards, 2 TD

Leading Receivers

- WASH – Jaydon Mickens, 8 receptions, 95 yards
- USM – Michael Thomas, 9 receptions, 190 yards, 2 TD

Leading Tacklers

- WASH – Brian Clay, 8 tackles
- USM – D'Nerius Antione, 10 tackles
