= 2015 Heart of Dallas Bowl =

2015 Zaxby's Heart of Dallas Bowl
- 6th Heart of Dallas Bowl
Washington Huskies	Southern Miss Golden Eagles
(6–6)	(9–4)
Pac-12	Conference USA
44	31
Head coach: Chris Petersen	Head coach: Todd Monken
	1	2	3	4	Total
Washington	14	7	10	13	44
Southern Miss	7	10	7	7	31
- Date: December 26, 2015
- Season: 2015
- Stadium: Cotton Bowl
- Location: Fair Park; Dallas, Texas
- MVP: Myles Gaskin (RB, Washington)
- Favorite: Washington by 8½
- National anthem: Monica Saldivar
- Referee: Michael Roche (American)
- Attendance: 20,229
- Payout: US$TBD

United States TV coverage
- Network: ESPN/RedVoice
- Announcers: Mike Corey, Ahmad Brooks, & Kayce Smith (ESPN); Brian Estridge, Rob Best, John Denton, & Landry Burdine (RedVoice)

The 2015 Heart of Dallas Bowl was a post-season American college football bowl game played on December 26, 2015 at the Cotton Bowl at Fair Park in Dallas, Texas. The sixth edition of the Heart of Dallas Bowl featured the Washington Huskies of the Pac-12 Conference against the Southern Miss Golden Eagles of Conference USA. It began at 1:20 p.m. CST and aired on ESPN. It was one of the 2015–16 bowl games that concluded the 2015 FBS football season. Sponsored by chicken fast food restaurant Zaxby's, the game was officially known as the Zaxby's Heart of Dallas Bowl. Washington Huskies defeated the University of Southern Mississippi 44–31.

== Teams ==
The game featured the Washington Huskies against the Southern Miss Golden Eagles.

=== Washington Huskies ===
After finishing their regular season 6–6, bowl director Brant Ringler extended an invitation for the Huskies to play in the game, which they accepted.

=== Southern Miss Golden Eagles ===
After finishing their season 9–4, Olivas extended an invitation for the Golden Eagles to play in the game, which they accepted as well.

== Game summary ==
=== Scoring summary ===
Scoring summary

Quarter	Time	Drive			Team	Scoring information	Score	
Quarter	Time	Plays	Yards	TOP	Team	Scoring information	WASH	USM
1	5:16	12	63	5:09	WASH	Myles Gaskin 2-yard touchdown run, Cameron Van Winkle kick good	7	0
1	3:33	4	69	1:37	USM	Mike Thomas 56-yard touchdown reception from Nick Mullens, Stephen Brauchle kick good	7	7
1	0:56	6	75	2:37	WASH	Myles Gaskin 1-yard touchdown run, Cameron Van Winkle kick good	14	7
2	10:56	13	73	4:53	USM	22-yard field goal by Stephen Brauchle	14	10
2	9:02	5	65	1:47	WASH	Jaydon Mickens 29-yard touchdown run, Cameron Van Winkle kick good	21	10
2	1:15	8	80	0:55	USM	Ito Smith 1-yard touchdown run, Stephen Brauchle kick good	21	17
3	8:23	10	56	4:09	WASH	24-yard field goal by Cameron Van Winkle	24	17
3	2:47	7	57	2:43	USM	Ito Smith 2-yard touchdown run, Stephen Brauchle kick good	24	24
3	2:26	1	86	0:16	WASH	Myles Gaskin 86-yard touchdown run, Cameron Van Winkle kick good	31	24
4	14:15	7	21	2:17	WASH	21-yard field goal by Cameron Van Winkle	34	24
4	7:53	9	74	4:51	WASH	Myles Gaskin 13-yard touchdown run, Cameron Van Winkle kick good	41	24
4	5:22	8	65	2:24	USM	Mike Thomas 27-yard touchdown reception from Nick Mullens, Stephen Brauchle kick good	41	31
4	0:13	10	45	5:08	WASH	23-yard field goal by Cameron Van Winkle	44	31
"TOP" = time of possession. For other American football terms, see Glossary of American football.							44	31

=== Statistics ===
Statistics	WASH	USM
First downs	27	22
Plays–yards	78–580	69–375
Rushes–yards	44–296	30–22
Passing yards	284	353
Passing: Comp–Att–Int	23–34–0	26–39–0
Time of possession	34:25	25:35
