= 2015 Conference USA Football Championship Game =

- Conference Championship
Southern Miss Golden Eagles	WKU Hilltoppers
(9–3)	(10–2)
28	45
Head coach: Todd Monken	Head coach: Jeff Brohm
	1	2	3	4	Total
Southern Miss	7	14	7	0	28
WKU	7	14	10	14	45
- Date: December 5, 2015
- Season: 2015
- Stadium: Houchens Industries–L. T. Smith Stadium
- Location: Bowling Green, KY
- MVP: QB Brandon Doughty (WKU)
- Favorite: Western Kentucky by 7.5
- Attendance: 16,823

United States TV coverage
- Network: ESPN2/TuneIn
- Announcers: Bob Wischusen, Brock Huard, and Shannon Spake (ESPN2); TJ Rives, Brad Hopkins (College Sports Now on TuneIn)

2015 Conference USA football standings
	Conf.			Overall
Team	W		L	W		L
East Division
No. 24 Western Kentucky x$	8	–	0	12	–	2
Middle Tennessee	6	–	2	7	–	6
Marshall	6	–	2	10	–	3
FIU	3	–	5	5	–	7
Old Dominion	3	–	5	5	–	7
Florida Atlantic	3	–	5	3	–	9
Charlotte*	0	–	8	2	–	10
West Division
Southern Miss x	7	–	1	9	–	5
Louisiana Tech	6	–	2	9	–	4
UTSA	3	–	5	3	–	9
UTEP	3	–	5	5	–	7
Rice	3	–	5	5	–	7
North Texas	1	–	7	1	–	11
Championship: Western Kentucky 45, Southern Miss 28
$ – Conference champion; x – Division champion/co-champions; * Ineligible for postseason bowl due to transition from FCS; As of January 12, 2015; Rankings from AP Poll

The 2015 Conference USA Football Championship Game determined the 2015 football champion of Conference USA (C-USA) and was held on December 5, 2015, in Bowling Green, Kentucky. The game was hosted by Western Kentucky (WKU), winner of the conference's East division, and also featured Southern Miss, winner of the conference's West division. This was the 11th edition of the Conference USA Football Championship Game and was won by WKU, 45–28.

== Teams ==
=== West Division Champions ===
The winner of Southern Miss vs. Louisiana Tech on November 28 decided the West division champion. Southern Miss won 58–24.

=== East Division Champions ===
The winner of Marshall vs. Western Kentucky on November 27 decided the East division champion. WKU won 49–28.
