= 2015 North Texas Mean Green football team =

American college football season

2015 North Texas Mean Green football
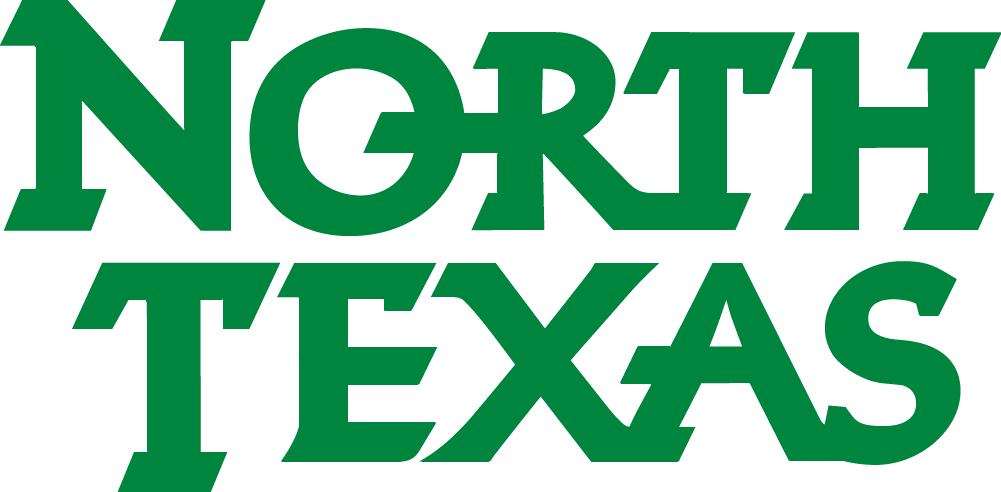
- Conference: Conference USA
- West Division
- Record: 1–11 (1–7 C-USA)
- Head coach: Dan McCarney (5th season; first 5 games); Mike Canales (interim, final 7 games)
- Offensive coordinator: Mike Canales (6th season)
- Offensive scheme: Pro-style
- Defensive coordinator: Chris Cosh (1st season)
- Base defense: 4–3
- Home stadium: Apogee Stadium

2015 Conference USA football standings
	Conf.			Overall
Team	W		L	W		L
East Division
No. 24 Western Kentucky x$	8	–	0	12	–	2
Middle Tennessee	6	–	2	7	–	6
Marshall	6	–	2	10	–	3
FIU	3	–	5	5	–	7
Old Dominion	3	–	5	5	–	7
Florida Atlantic	3	–	5	3	–	9
Charlotte*	0	–	8	2	–	10
West Division
Southern Miss x	7	–	1	9	–	5
Louisiana Tech	6	–	2	9	–	4
UTSA	3	–	5	3	–	9
UTEP	3	–	5	5	–	7
Rice	3	–	5	5	–	7
North Texas	1	–	7	1	–	11
Championship: Western Kentucky 45, Southern Miss 28
$ – Conference champion; x – Division champion/co-champions; * Ineligible for postseason bowl due to transition from FCS; As of January 12, 2015; Rankings from AP Poll

The 2015 North Texas Mean Green football team represented the University of North Texas as a member of Conference USA (C-USA) during the 2015 NCAA Division I FBS football season. Led by Dan McCarney in his fifth and final season for the first five games of the year, and then by interim head coach Mike Canales for the remainder of the season, the Mean Green compiled an overall record of 1–11 with a mark 1–7 in conference play, placing last out of six teams in C-USA's West Division. The team played home games at Apogee Stadium in Denton, Texas.

On October 10, McCarney was fired after a 66–7 blowout loss to Portland State, the largest victory ever by an NCAA Division I Football Championship Subdivision (FCS) team over an NCAA Division I Football Bowl Subdivision FBS) opponent ever. Offensive coordinator Mike Canales was named interim head coach for the remainder of the season.

== Schedule ==
North Texas announced their 2015 football schedule on February 2, 2015. The schedule consisted of five home and seven away games.

Date	Time	Opponent	Site	TV	Result	Attendance
September 12	6:00 pm	at SMU*	Gerald J. Ford Stadium; University Park, TX (Safeway Bowl)	ESPN3	L 13–31	25,401
September 19	1:30 pm	Rice	Apogee Stadium; Denton, TX	FCS	L 24–38	19,602
September 26	2:30 pm	at Iowa*	Kinnick Stadium; Iowa City, IA	ESPNU	L 16–62	56,041
October 3	6:00 pm	at Southern Miss	M. M. Roberts Stadium; Hattiesburg, MS	FCS	L 14–49	26,430
October 10	4:00 pm	No. 25 (FCS) Portland State*^{†}	Apogee Stadium; Denton, TX	ntTV	L 7–66	19,801
October 15	6:30 pm	Western Kentucky	Apogee Stadium; Denton, TX	CBSSN	L 28–55	10,155
October 24	2:30 pm	at Marshall	Joan C. Edwards Stadium; Huntington, WV	FSN	L 13–30	27,217
October 31	6:00 pm	UTSA	Apogee Stadium; Denton, TX	ASN	W 30–23	10,292
November 7	2:30 pm	at Louisiana Tech	Joe Aillet Stadium; Ruston, LA	FCS	L 13–56	16,986
November 14	11:00 am	at Tennessee*	Neyland Stadium; Knoxville, TN	SECN	L 0–24	96,197
November 21	11:00 am	at Middle Tennessee	Johnny "Red" Floyd Stadium; Murfreesboro, TN	ASN	L 7–41	13,922
November 28	2:30 pm	UTEP	Apogee Stadium; Denton, TX	FSN	L 17–20	8,305
*Non-conference game; ^{†}Homecoming; Rankings from STATS Poll released prior to the game; All times are in Central time

== Preseason ==
=== Conference USA media poll ===
The Conference USA media prediction poll was released on July 15, 2015. The Mean Green were predicted to finish fifth in the West Division.

== Game summaries ==
=== At SMU ===
	1	2	3	4	Total
Mean Green	3	3	7	0	13
Mustangs	7	0	3	21	31

Statistics	UNT	SMU
First downs	17	27
Total yards	240	444
Rushing yards	112	273
Passing yards	128	171
Turnovers	4	3
Time of possession	24:10	35:50

Team	Category	Player	Statistics
North Texas	Passing	Andrew McNulty	16/34, 128 yards, 2 INT
North Texas	Rushing	Andrew Tucker	10 rushes, 50 yards
North Texas	Receiving	Turner Smiley	3 receptions, 42 yards
SMU	Passing	Matt Davis	17/24, 171 yards, 2 TD
SMU	Rushing	Matt Davis	17 rushes, 125 yards, 2 TD
SMU	Receiving	Courtland Sutton	5 receptions, 65 yards, TD

=== Rice ===
	1	2	3	4	Total
Owls	0	17	21	0	38
Mean Green	3	7	7	7	24

Statistics	RICE	UNT
First downs	28	20
Total yards	562	478
Rushing yards	189	175
Passing yards	373	303
Turnovers	0	3
Time of possession	41:50	18:10

Team	Category	Player	Statistics
Rice	Passing	Driphus Jackson	29/39, 373 yards, 3 TD
Rice	Rushing	Jowan Davis	21 rushes, 102 yards
Rice	Receiving	Dennis Parks	8 receptions, 163 yards, 2 TD
North Texas	Passing	Andrew McNulty	19/35, 303 yards, 2 TD, INT
North Texas	Rushing	Antoinne Jimmerson	13 rushes, 94 yards
North Texas	Receiving	Carlos Harris	8 receptions, 193 yards, 2 TD

=== At Iowa ===
	1	2	3	4	Total
Mean Green	0	13	3	0	16
Hawkeyes	14	21	13	14	62

Statistics	UNT	IOWA
First downs	22	23
Total yards	356	488
Rushing yards	183	210
Passing yards	173	278
Turnovers	3	2
Time of possession	28:15	31:45

Team	Category	Player	Statistics
North Texas	Passing	Andrew McNulty	14/36, 137 yards, INT
North Texas	Rushing	Jeff Wilson	15 rushes, 75 yards
North Texas	Receiving	Carlos Harris	5 receptions, 43 yards
Iowa	Passing	C. J. Beathard	18/21, 278 yards, 2 TD
Iowa	Rushing	Jordan Canzeri	22 rushes, 115 yards, 4 TD
Iowa	Receiving	Tevaun Smith	4 receptions, 115 yards, TD

=== At Southern Miss ===
	1	2	3	4	Total
Mean Green	0	0	0	14	14
Golden Eagles	7	14	14	14	49

Statistics	UNT	USM
First downs	26	24
Total yards	386	573
Rushing yards	185	248
Passing yards	201	325
Turnovers	1	0
Time of possession	29:51	30:09

Team	Category	Player	Statistics
North Texas	Passing	Andrew McNulty	11/21, 131 yards, TD
North Texas	Rushing	Jeff Wilson	22 rushes, 136 yards
North Texas	Receiving	Carlos Harris	9 receptions, 136 yards, TD
Southern Miss	Passing	Nick Mullens	27/36, 325 yards, 4 TD
Southern Miss	Rushing	Justice Hayes	16 rushes, 86 yards, TD
Southern Miss	Receiving	Mike Thomas	7 receptions, 155 yards, 3 TD

=== Portland State ===
	1	2	3	4	Total
No. 25 (FCS) Vikings	14	31	14	7	66
Mean Green	0	0	0	7	7

Statistics	PRST	UNT
First downs	27	13
Total yards	670	198
Rushing yards	368	76
Passing yards	302	122
Turnovers	0	1
Time of possession	33:37	26:23

Team	Category	Player	Statistics
Portland State	Passing	Alex Kuresa	11/19, 269 yards, 3 TD
Portland State	Rushing	David Jones	9 rushes, 134 yards, 2 TD
Portland State	Receiving	Darnell Adams	4 receptions, 100 yards, TD
North Texas	Passing	Andrew McNulty	10/25, 57 yards
North Texas	Rushing	Jeff Wilson	9 rushes, 49 yards
North Texas	Receiving	Carlos Harris	9 receptions, 57 yards, TD

Following the 66–7 loss to FCS Portland State, Mean Green head coach Dan McCarney was fired. The 59-point margin is the biggest FCS win over an FBS team since Division I football was divided into the groupings now known as FCS and FBS in 1978.

=== Western Kentucky ===
	1	2	3	4	Total
Hilltoppers	14	20	14	7	55
Mean Green	0	14	0	14	28

Statistics	WKU	UNT
First downs	35	22
Total yards	683	431
Rushing yards	283	203
Passing yards	400	228
Turnovers	1	2
Time of possession	33:54	26:06

Team	Category	Player	Statistics
Western Kentucky	Passing	Brandon Doughty	26/37, 350 yards, 4 TD, INT
Western Kentucky	Rushing	Anthony Wales	21 rushes, 193 yards, 2 TD
Western Kentucky	Receiving	Taywan Taylor	7 receptions, 134 yards, 2 TD
North Texas	Passing	Damarcus Smith	17/35, 228 yards, 4 TD, INT
North Texas	Rushing	Damarcus Smith	16 rushes, 122 yards
North Texas	Receiving	Darvin Kidsy	3 receptions, 93 yards, TD

=== At Marshall ===
	1	2	3	4	Total
Mean Green	0	3	3	7	13
Thundering Herd	17	7	3	3	30

Statistics	UNT	MRSH
First downs	22	21
Total yards	337	402
Rushing yards	209	213
Passing yards	128	189
Turnovers	1	0
Time of possession	25:03	34:57

Team	Category	Player	Statistics
North Texas	Passing	Damarcus Smith	15/37, 128 yards, TD, INT
North Texas	Rushing	Jeff Wilson	17 rushes, 138 yards
North Texas	Receiving	Darvin Kidsy	4 receptions, 44 yards, TD
Marshall	Passing	Chase Litton	19/34, 189 yards, TD
Marshall	Rushing	Hyleck Foster	17 rushes, 105 yards, TD
Marshall	Receiving	Deandre Reaves	6 receptions, 68 yards

=== UTSA ===
	1	2	3	4	Total
Roadrunners	7	3	7	6	23
Mean Green	0	7	7	16	30

Statistics	UTSA	UNT
First downs	31	20
Total yards	477	371
Rushing yards	232	267
Passing yards	245	104
Turnovers	1	1
Time of possession	37:36	22:24

Team	Category	Player	Statistics
UTSA	Passing	Dalton Sturm	27/41, 245 yards, TD
UTSA	Rushing	Dalton Sturm	21 rushes, 78 yards
UTSA	Receiving	Kerry Thomas Jr.	9 receptions, 75 yards
North Texas	Passing	Damarcus Smith	11/22, 104 yards
North Texas	Rushing	Damarcus Smith	14 rushes, 137 yards, TD
North Texas	Receiving	Carlos Harris	6 receptions, 72 yards

=== At Louisiana Tech ===
	1	2	3	4	Total
Mean Green	0	0	0	13	13
Bulldogs	21	7	14	14	56

Statistics	UNT	LT
First downs	20	25
Total yards	316	573
Rushing yards	82	274
Passing yards	234	299
Turnovers	4	3
Time of possession	32:53	27:07

Team	Category	Player	Statistics
North Texas	Passing	Damarcus Smith	25/45, 234 yards, 2 TD, INT
North Texas	Rushing	Jeff Wilson	16 rushes, 67 yards
North Texas	Receiving	Carlos Harris	5 receptions, 74 yards, TD
Louisiana Tech	Passing	Jeff Driskel	17/26, 296 yards, INT
Louisiana Tech	Rushing	Kenneth Dixon	22 rushes, 195 yards, 6 TD
Louisiana Tech	Receiving	Carlos Henderson	5 receptions, 162 yards

=== At Tennessee ===
	1	2	3	4	Total
Mean Green	0	0	0	0	0
Volunteers	7	10	0	7	24

Statistics	UNT	TENN
First downs	14	24
Total yards	199	409
Rushing yards	92	237
Passing yards	107	172
Turnovers	0	1
Time of possession	30:59	29:01

Team	Category	Player	Statistics
North Texas	Passing	Damarcus Smith	12/25, 103 yards
North Texas	Rushing	Jeff Wilson	14 rushes, 52 yards
North Texas	Receiving	Marcus Smith	5 receptions, 46 yards
Tennessee	Passing	Joshua Dobbs	15/23, 136 yards, INT
Tennessee	Rushing	Alvin Kamara	15 rushes, 127 yards, 2 TD
Tennessee	Receiving	Josh Malone	4 receptions, 38 yards

=== At Middle Tennessee ===
	1	2	3	4	Total
Mean Green	0	7	0	0	7
Blue Raiders	14	17	10	0	41

Statistics	UNT	MTSU
First downs	18	30
Total yards	324	494
Rushing yards	191	165
Passing yards	133	329
Turnovers	3	2
Time of possession	28:48	31:12

Team	Category	Player	Statistics
North Texas	Passing	Damarcus Smith	10/17, 80 yards, INT
North Texas	Rushing	Willy Ivery	7 rushes, 59 yards
North Texas	Receiving	Darvin Kidsy	4 receptions, 53 yards
Middle Tennessee	Passing	Brent Stockstill	27/38, 322 yards, 3 TD, INT
Middle Tennessee	Rushing	Jordan Parker	11 rushes, 55 yards, TD
Middle Tennessee	Receiving	Richie James	11 receptions, 98 yards

=== UTEP ===
	1	2	3	4	Total
Miners	0	0	13	7	20
Mean Green	3	0	14	0	17

Statistics	UTEP	UNT
First downs	15	10
Total yards	256	205
Rushing yards	187	129
Passing yards	69	76
Turnovers	5	2
Time of possession	33:47	26:13

Team	Category	Player	Statistics
UTEP	Passing	Kavika Johnson	4/11, 43 yards, TD
UTEP	Rushing	Kavika Johnson	16 rushes, 75 yards, TD
UTEP	Receiving	Warren Redix	3 receptions, 42 yards, TD
North Texas	Passing	Andrew McNulty	7/15, 48 yards
North Texas	Rushing	Jeff Wilson	15 rushes, 56 yards
North Texas	Receiving	Terian Goree	3 receptions, 28 yards
