= 2015 Marshall Thundering Herd football team =

American college football season

2015 Marshall Thundering Herd football

St. Petersburg Bowl champion

St. Petersburg Bowl, W 16–10 vs. UConn
- Conference: Conference USA
- East Division
- Record: 10–3 (6–2 C-USA)
- Head coach: Doc Holliday (6th season)
- Offensive coordinator: Bill Legg (6th season)
- Offensive scheme: Spread
- Defensive coordinator: Chuck Heater (3rd season)
- Base defense: 3–4
- Home stadium: Joan C. Edwards Stadium

2015 Conference USA football standings
	Conf.			Overall
Team	W		L	W		L
East Division
No. 24 Western Kentucky x$	8	–	0	12	–	2
Middle Tennessee	6	–	2	7	–	6
Marshall	6	–	2	10	–	3
FIU	3	–	5	5	–	7
Old Dominion	3	–	5	5	–	7
Florida Atlantic	3	–	5	3	–	9
Charlotte*	0	–	8	2	–	10
West Division
Southern Miss x	7	–	1	9	–	5
Louisiana Tech	6	–	2	9	–	4
UTSA	3	–	5	3	–	9
UTEP	3	–	5	5	–	7
Rice	3	–	5	5	–	7
North Texas	1	–	7	1	–	11
Championship: Western Kentucky 45, Southern Miss 28
$ – Conference champion; x – Division champion/co-champions; * Ineligible for postseason bowl due to transition from FCS; As of January 12, 2015; Rankings from AP Poll

The 2015 Marshall Thundering Herd football team represented Marshall University in the 2015 NCAA Division I FBS football season as members of the East Division of Conference USA. They were led by sixth-year head coach John "Doc" Holliday and played their home games at Joan C. Edwards Stadium in Huntington, West Virginia. They finished the season 10–3, 6–2 in C-USA play to finish in a tie for second place in the East Division. They were invited to the St. Petersburg Bowl where they defeated UConn.

== Schedule ==
Marshall announced their 2015 football schedule on February 2, 2015. The 2015 schedule consisted of six home and away games in the regular season. The Thundering Herd hosted CUSA foes Florida International (FIU), North Texas, Old Dominion, and Southern Miss, and travelled to Charlotte, Florida Atlantic, Middle Tennessee, and Western Kentucky (WKU).

Marshall went undefeated at home but lost three road games, finishing the regular season with a 9–3 record and finishing third in the division. Marshall was invited to the St. Petersburg Bowl against the University of Connecticut which they won with a final score of 16–10.

Date	Time	Opponent	Site	TV	Result	Attendance
September 6	3:00 pm	Purdue*	Joan C. Edwards Stadium; Huntington, WV	FS1	W 41–31	38,791
September 12	7:00 pm	at Ohio*	Peden Stadium; Athens, OH (Battle for the Bell)	ESPN3	L 10–21	25,210
September 19	3:30 pm	Norfolk State*	Joan C. Edwards Stadium; Huntington, WV	ASN	W 45–7	24,114
September 26	3:30 pm	at Kent State*	Dix Stadium; Kent, OH	ASN	W 36–29 ^{2OT}	15,424
October 3	3:30 pm	Old Dominion	Joan C. Edwards Stadium; Huntington, WV	ASN	W 27–7	18,473
October 9	7:00 pm	Southern Miss	Joan C. Edwards Stadium; Huntington, WV	CBSSN	W 31–10	22,763
October 17	12:00 pm	at Florida Atlantic	FAU Stadium; Boca Raton, FL	FCS	W 33–17	17,129
October 24	3:30 pm	North Texas^{†}	Joan C. Edwards Stadium; Huntington, WV	FSN	W 30–13	27,217
October 31	3:30 pm	at Charlotte	Jerry Richardson Stadium; Charlotte, NC	FSN	W 34–10	15,381
November 7	3:30 pm	at Middle Tennessee	Johnny "Red" Floyd Stadium; Murfreesboro, TN	FSN	L 24–27 ^{3OT}	18,760
November 14	3:30 pm	FIU	Joan C. Edwards Stadium; Huntington, WV	FSN	W 52–0	26,572
November 27	12:00 pm	at Western Kentucky	Houchens Industries–L. T. Smith Stadium; Bowling Green, KY	FS1	L 28–49	17,687
December 26	11:00 am	vs. UConn*	Tropicana Field; St. Petersburg, FL (St. Petersburg Bowl)	ESPN	W 16–10	14,652
*Non-conference game; ^{†}Homecoming; All times are in Eastern time

Schedule source:

== Game summaries ==
=== Purdue ===
	1	2	3	4	Total
Boilermakers	14	7	7	3	31
Thundering Herd	17	0	10	14	41

=== Ohio ===
	1	2	3	4	Total
Thundering Herd	0	7	3	0	10
Bobcats	7	7	0	7	21

=== Norfolk State ===
	1	2	3	4	Total
Spartans	7	0	0	0	7
Thundering Herd	10	14	14	7	45

=== Kent State ===
	1	2	3	4	OT	2OT	Total
Thundering Herd	7	0	7	8	7	7	36
Golden Flashes	6	7	6	3	7	0	29

=== Old Dominion ===
	1	2	3	4	Total
Monarchs	0	0	0	7	7
Thundering Herd	7	7	7	6	27

=== Southern Miss ===
	1	2	3	4	Total
Golden Eagles	7	3	0	0	10
Thundering Herd	7	10	14	0	31

=== Florida Atlantic ===
	1	2	3	4	Total
Thundering Herd	9	14	7	3	33
Owls	3	7	7	0	17

=== North Texas ===
	1	2	3	4	Total
Mean Green	0	3	3	7	13
Thundering Herd	17	7	3	3	30

=== Charlotte ===
	1	2	3	4	Total
Thundering Herd	14	17	0	3	34
49ers	0	3	0	7	10

=== Middle Tennessee ===
	1	2	3	4	OT	2OT	3OT	Total
Thundering Herd	7	0	0	10	7	0	0	24
Blue Raiders	0	7	10	0	7	0	3	27

=== Florida International ===
	1	2	3	4	Total
Panthers	0	0	0	0	0
Thundering Herd	21	17	7	7	52

=== Western Kentucky ===
	1	2	3	4	Total
Thundering Herd	0	14	7	7	28
Hilltoppers	7	28	6	8	49

=== UConn (St. Petersburg Bowl) ===
	1	2	3	4	Total
Huskies	7	0	3	0	10
Thundering Herd	7	6	0	3	16
