= 2015 UTSA Roadrunners football team =

American college football season

2015 UTSA Roadrunners football
- Conference: Conference USA
- West Division
- Record: 3–9 (3–5 C-USA)
- Head coach: Larry Coker (5th season)
- Offensive coordinator: Kevin Brown (4th season)
- Offensive scheme: Multiple
- Defensive coordinator: Neal Neathery (5th season)
- Base defense: 4–2–5
- Home stadium: Alamodome

2015 Conference USA football standings
	Conf.			Overall
Team	W		L	W		L
East Division
No. 24 Western Kentucky x$	8	–	0	12	–	2
Middle Tennessee	6	–	2	7	–	6
Marshall	6	–	2	10	–	3
FIU	3	–	5	5	–	7
Old Dominion	3	–	5	5	–	7
Florida Atlantic	3	–	5	3	–	9
Charlotte*	0	–	8	2	–	10
West Division
Southern Miss x	7	–	1	9	–	5
Louisiana Tech	6	–	2	9	–	4
UTSA	3	–	5	3	–	9
UTEP	3	–	5	5	–	7
Rice	3	–	5	5	–	7
North Texas	1	–	7	1	–	11
Championship: Western Kentucky 45, Southern Miss 28
$ – Conference champion; x – Division champion/co-champions; * Ineligible for postseason bowl due to transition from FCS; As of January 12, 2015; Rankings from AP Poll

The 2015 UTSA Roadrunners football team represented the University of Texas at San Antonio in the 2015 NCAA Division I FBS football season. That was the fifth season for football at UTSA and their third as members of Conference USA in the West Division. Larry Coker returned as the team's head coach for a fifth season. The Roadrunners played their home games at the Alamodome. They finished the season 3–9, 3–5 in C-USA play to finish in a three way tie for third place in the West Division.

On January 5, head coach Larry Coker resigned. In five seasons as UTSA's first head coach, Coker had a record of 26–31.

After the season, tight end David Morgan II became the first NFL draft pick from UTSA when he was selected by the Minnesota Vikings in the 6th round.

== Schedule ==
UTSA announced their 2015 football schedule on February 2, 2015. The 2015 schedule consist of 6 home and away games in the regular season. The Roadrunners will host C-USA opponents Louisiana Tech, Middle Tennessee, Old Dominion, and Rice, and will travel to Charlotte, North Texas, Southern Miss, and UTEP.

Date	Time	Opponent	Site	TV	Result	Attendance
September 3	9:00 p.m.	at No. 22 Arizona*	Arizona Stadium; Tucson, AZ	P12N	L 32–42	51,111
September 12	11:00 a.m.	Kansas State*	Alamodome; San Antonio, TX	FS1	L 3–30	29,424
September 19	2:30 p.m.	at No. 25 Oklahoma State*	Boone Pickens Stadium; Stillwater, OK	FS1	L 14–69	54,351
September 26	6:00 p.m.	Colorado State*	Alamodome; San Antonio, TX	CBSSN	L 31–33	24,705
October 3	7:00 p.m.	at UTEP	Sun Bowl; El Paso, TX	KMYS	W 25–6	25,951
October 10	6:00 p.m.	Louisiana Tech	Alamodome; San Antonio, TX	ASN	L 31–34	24,392
October 17	6:00 p.m.	at Southern Miss	M. M. Roberts Stadium; Hattiesburg, MS	ASN	L 10–32	28,745
October 31	6:00 p.m.	at North Texas	Apogee Stadium; Denton, TX	ASN	L 23–30	10,292
November 7	6:00 p.m.	Old Dominion^{†}	Alamodome; San Antonio, TX	ASN	L 31–36	19,586
November 14	1:00 p.m.	at Charlotte	Jerry Richardson Stadium; Charlotte, NC	FCS	W 30–27 ^{OT}	11,331
November 21	6:00 p.m.	Rice	Alamodome; San Antonio, TX	ASN	W 34–24	20,437
November 28	1:30 p.m.	Middle Tennessee	Alamodome; San Antonio, TX	FCS	L 7–42	19,504
*Non-conference game; ^{†}Homecoming; Rankings from AP Poll released prior to game; All times are in Central time

Schedule source:

== Game summaries ==
=== At #22 Arizona ===
	1	2	3	4	Total
Roadrunners	0	20	6	6	32
#22 Wildcats	14	7	14	7	42

=== Kansas State ===
	1	2	3	4	Total
Wildcats	0	7	6	17	30
Roadrunners	3	0	0	0	3

=== At Oklahoma State ===
	1	2	3	4	Total
Roadrunners	0	7	0	7	14
Cowboys	17	14	10	28	69

=== Colorado State ===
	1	2	3	4	Total
Rams	9	7	14	3	33
Roadrunners	7	10	7	7	31

=== At UTEP ===
	1	2	3	4	Total
Roadrunners	0	3	15	7	25
Miners	0	0	0	6	6

=== Louisiana Tech ===
	1	2	3	4	Total
Bulldogs	10	14	7	3	34
Roadrunners	3	7	14	7	31

=== At Southern Miss ===
	1	2	3	4	Total
Roadrunners	0	0	10	0	10
Golden Eagles	7	9	10	6	32

=== At North Texas ===
	1	2	3	4	Total
Roadrunners	7	3	7	6	23
Mean Green	0	7	7	16	30

=== Old Dominion ===
	1	2	3	4	Total
Monarchs	3	13	7	13	36
Roadrunners	14	0	7	10	31

=== At Charlotte ===
	1	2	3	4	OT	Total
Roadrunners	0	0	20	7	3	30
49ers	0	7	14	6	0	27

=== Rice ===
	1	2	3	4	Total
Owls	10	7	7	0	24
Roadrunners	7	21	6	0	34

=== At Middle Tennessee ===
	1	2	3	4	Total
Roadrunners	0	0	0	7	7
Blue Raiders	7	14	14	7	42
