= 2015 Florida Atlantic Owls football team =

American college football season

2015 Florida Atlantic Owls football
- Conference: Conference USA
- East Division
- Record: 3–9 (3–5 C-USA)
- Head coach: Charlie Partridge (2nd season)
- Offensive coordinator: Brian Wright (4th season)
- Offensive scheme: Spread
- Defensive coordinator: Roc Bellantoni (2nd season)
- Base defense: 4–3
- Home stadium: FAU Stadium

2015 Conference USA football standings
	Conf.			Overall
Team	W		L	W		L
East Division
No. 24 Western Kentucky x$	8	–	0	12	–	2
Middle Tennessee	6	–	2	7	–	6
Marshall	6	–	2	10	–	3
FIU	3	–	5	5	–	7
Old Dominion	3	–	5	5	–	7
Florida Atlantic	3	–	5	3	–	9
Charlotte*	0	–	8	2	–	10
West Division
Southern Miss x	7	–	1	9	–	5
Louisiana Tech	6	–	2	9	–	4
UTSA	3	–	5	3	–	9
UTEP	3	–	5	5	–	7
Rice	3	–	5	5	–	7
North Texas	1	–	7	1	–	11
Championship: Western Kentucky 45, Southern Miss 28
$ – Conference champion; x – Division champion/co-champions; * Ineligible for postseason bowl due to transition from FCS; As of January 12, 2015; Rankings from AP Poll

The 2015 Florida Atlantic Owls football team represented Florida Atlantic University in the 2015 NCAA Division I FBS football season as members of the East Division of Conference USA. They were led by second-year head coach Charlie Partridge and played their home games at FAU Stadium in Boca Raton, Florida. They finished the season 3–9, 3–5 in C-USA play to finish in a three way tie for fourth place in the East Division.

== Schedule ==
Florida Atlantic announced their 2015 football schedule on February 2, 2015. The 2015 schedule consist of six home and away games in the regular season. The Owls will host CUSA foes Florida International (FIU), Marshall, Middle Tennessee, and Rice, and will travel to Charlotte, Old Dominion, UTEP, and Western Kentucky (WKU).

Date	Time	Opponent	Site	TV	Result	Attendance
September 5	3:30 p.m.	at Tulsa*	Chapman Stadium; Tulsa, OK	CBSSN	L 44–47 ^{OT}	24,001
September 11	8:00 p.m.	Miami (FL)*	FAU Stadium; Boca, Raton, FL	FS1	L 20–44	30,321
September 19	12:00 p.m.	Buffalo*	FAU Stadium; Boca Raton, FL	ASN	L 15–33	15,397
September 26	7:00 p.m.	at Charlotte	Jerry Richardson Stadium; Charlotte, NC	ASN	W 17–7	17,444
October 10	2:30 p.m.	Rice	FAU Stadium; Boca Raton, FL	FCS	L 26–27	13,191
October 17	12:00 p.m.	Marshall	FAU Stadium; Boca Raton, FL	FCS	L 17–33	17,129
October 24	7:00 p.m.	at UTEP	Sun Bowl; El Paso, TX	ASN	L 17–27	22,468
October 31	3:30 p.m.	FIU^{†}	FAU Stadium; Boca Raton, FL (Shula Bowl)	ASN	W 31–17	16,432
November 7	12:00 p.m.	at Western Kentucky	Houchens Industries–L. T. Smith Stadium; Bowling Green, KY	FSN	L 19–35	18,421
November 14	12:00 p.m.	Middle Tennessee	FAU Stadium; Boca Raton, FL	ASN	L 17–24	13,233
November 21	12:00 p.m.	at No. 8 Florida*	Ben Hill Griffin Stadium; Gainesville, FL	SECN	L 14–20 ^{OT}	90,107
November 28	12:00 p.m.	at Old Dominion	Foreman Field; Norfolk, VA (Oyster Bowl)	ASN	W 33–31	20,118
*Non-conference game; ^{†}Homecoming; Rankings from AP Poll released prior to game; All times are in Eastern time

Schedule source:

== Game summaries ==
=== At Tulsa ===
	1	2	3	4	OT	Total
Owls	7	10	21	3	3	44
Golden Hurricane	14	7	7	13	6	47

=== Miami (FL) ===
	1	2	3	4	Total
Hurricanes	14	6	17	7	44
Owls	10	7	3	0	20

=== Buffalo ===
	1	2	3	4	Total
Bulls	0	7	19	7	33
Owls	2	7	0	6	15

=== At Charlotte ===
	1	2	3	4	Total
Owls	7	3	0	7	17
49ers	0	0	0	7	7

=== Rice ===
	1	2	3	4	Total
Rice Owls	14	0	0	13	27
FAU Owls	7	7	6	6	26

=== Marshall ===
	1	2	3	4	Total
Thundering Herd	9	14	7	3	33
Owls	3	7	7	0	17

=== At UTEP ===
	1	2	3	4	Total
Owls	0	17	0	0	17
Miners	7	7	7	6	27

=== FIU ===
	1	2	3	4	Total
Panthers	0	7	3	7	17
Owls	7	10	0	14	31

=== At Western Kentucky ===
	1	2	3	4	Total
Owls	7	6	6	0	19
Hilltoppers	0	14	14	7	35

=== Middle Tennessee ===
	1	2	3	4	Total
Blue Raiders	10	7	7	0	24
Owls	7	7	3	0	17

=== At Florida ===
	1	2	3	4	OT	Total
Owls	0	0	7	7	0	14
Gators	0	0	14	0	6	20

=== At Old Dominion ===
	1	2	3	4	Total
Owls	14	10	3	6	33
Monarchs	3	7	21	0	31

== Roster ==
2015 Florida Atlantic Owls football team roster
Players
Coaches
Offense

Pos.	#	Name	Class
WR	1	Henry Bussey	So
WR	2	James Brunson	Fr
QB	3	Tyler Cameron	GS
WR	4	Derek Moise	RSr
FB	5	Kal-El Williams	Fr
RB	6	Kerrith Whyte	Fr
WR	7	Tavaris Harrison	Fr
WR	8	Ralph Leonard	Fr
RB	9	Greg Howell	So
TE	10	Dustin Bowens	RSo
QB	13	Daniel Parr	Fr
WR	14	J'Quan Napier	Fr
QB	16	Jason Driskel	RFr
QB	18	Raymond Rizk	Fr
QB	19	Joshua Cartwright	Fr
RB	20	Marcus Clark	RSo
RB	22	Trey Rodriguez	Fr
RB	25	Jay Warren	Jr
RB	30	Jeremy Gaskins	Sr
QB	32	Jaquez Johnson	RSr
WR	35	JJ Stevens	RSo
WR	37	Calvain Holmes	RFr
RB	40	Adrian Sterling	RJr
TE	41	Michael Harrop	Sr
TE	42	London Gowins	Fr
TE	44	Jacob Wilson	RFr
TE	46	Brett Seelig	RFr
OL	52	Arthur Crouse	RJr
OL	53	Jakobi Smith	RSo
OL	57	Matthew Weiner	Fr
OL	58	Reggie Bain	So
OL	60	Shane Blair	RJr
OL	62	Bryan Beck	Fr
OL	64	Antonyo Woods	RSo
OL	65	Tarrick Thomas	Fr
OL	66	Dillon DeBoer	RJr
TE	69	Anthony Russell	RSo
OL	70	Austin Bland	RSo
OL	72	Chris Jones	RFr
OL	73	Mikingson Marsaille	RSr
OT	74	Byers Hickmon	RFr
OL	75	Jack Breshears	Fr
OL	76	Kelly Parfitt	RJr
OL	77	Roman Fernandez	RSo
OL	78	Richard Williams	Fr
OL	79	Siffo Pierre	RFr
TE	80	Nate Terry	So
WR	81	Kalib Woods	RSo
WR	82	Kamrin Solomon	So
WR	83	Tony Thomas	Jr
WR	84	Ladante Harris	Fr
TE	85	Chandler Dexter	Jr
WR	86	Parker Collins	Fr
WR	87	Bobby Mitchell	RFr
WR	88	Jenson Stoshak	Sr
WR	89	Darius James	Fr

Defense

Pos.	#	Name	Class
DB	1	Ocie Rose	Fr
DL	2	Brandin Bryant	RSr
DB	3	DJ Juste	Jr
S	4	Marquese Dudley-Gordon	RFr
CB	5	Ronnie Scott	RSo
CB	6	Reggie Brown	RSo
DB	7	Cre'von LeBlanc	Sr
DL	8	Nick Internicola	RSo
DE	9	Trey Hendrickson	Jr
DB	10	Herb Miller	Fr
DT	11	Trevon Coley	Sr
DB	12	Kemar Downer	Fr
CB	13	Shelton Lewis	Fr
DL	15	Devin Santana	RFr
S	16	Richie Kittles	Fr
S	18	Jalen Young	Fr
LB	19	Jaye Miner	Fr
DB	20	Jake Stoshak	RFr
S	21	Rodrick Archer	Fr
DB	23	Raekwon Williams	So
DB	24	Lester Thomas	Jr
S	26	Richard Thompson	So
DB	27	Andrew Soroh	RFr
LB	28	Azeez Al-Shaair	Fr
DB	28	Alfred Ansley	RFr
DB	29	Sharrod Neasman	Sr
LB	31	Kris Harris	RFr
DB	33	Aaron Parker	Fr
LB	34	Freedom Whitfield	Sr
DB	36	Anthony Hamilton	RJr
S	39	Anthony DeLeo	Fr
DB	40	Tevin Homer	Jr
LB	41	Andrew Matyk	RSo
DL	42	Josh Ballesteros	RJr
LB	43	Robert Relf	Jr
LB	44	Jake Stewart	RFr
LB	45	Jacob Douglas	Fr
DB	46	Rayshun Jones	Fr
LB	47	Jerrad Ward	So
LB	48	Andy Bien-Aime	RFr
LB	49	Khantrell Burden	Fr
LB	50	Nate Ozdemir	RSo
LB	51	Lance Virgile	RSo
DT	54	Ray Ellis	So
DL	56	Steven Leggett	Fr
DE	59	Robinson Eugene	RSr
DL	63	Winston Chastang	RFr
DL	78	Kenneth Stephens	Jr
DT	90	Shalom Ogbonda	RJr
DL	91	Denzel Whitfield	RJr
DL	94	Hunter Snyder	RFr
DL	95	Nick Richardson	RFr
DL	96	Jayson King	Fr
DL	97	Anthony Bennett	Fr
DL	98	Haiden Nagel	RSo
DT	99	Josh Kendall	Jr

Special teams

Pos.	#	Name	Class
K	15	Landon Scheer	RFr
K	17	Greg Joseph	Jr
P	67	Dalton Schomp	RJr
LS	68	Mario Elliott	RSo
LS	92	Casey Winner	Fr
LS	93	JR Clancy	Fr
P	99	Ryan Rickel	Jr

Head coach

- Charlie Partridge

Coordinators/assistant coaches

- Brian Wright – Assoc. Head Coach/OC
- Roc Bellantoni – Defensive Coordinator/LB
- Chris Hurd – Special Teams Coordinator/TE
- Jared Allen – Assistant Coach /RB
- Corey Bell – Assist. Coach/Secondary/Assist. Player Personnel
- Terrance Jamison – Assistant Coach/DL
- Bart Miller – Assistant Coach/OL
- Dan Shula – Assistant Coach/WR
- Ben Strickland – Assistant Coach/DB
- Graham Wilbert – Dir. of Player Personnel/External
- Steven Dell – Graduate Assistant
- Nexon Dorvilus – Graduate Assistant
- AJ Hopp – Graduate Assistant
- Pat Muldoon – Graduate Assistant
- Heather Henderson – Dir. Football Operations

Legend

- (C) Team captain
- (S) Suspended
- (I) Ineligible
- Injured
- Redshirt

Roster
