= 2015 FIU Panthers football team =

American college football season

2015 FIU Panthers football
- Conference: Conference USA
- East Division
- Record: 5–7 (3–5 C-USA)
- Head coach: Ron Turner (3rd season)
- Offensive coordinator: Steve Shankweiler (2nd season)
- Offensive scheme: Pro set
- Defensive coordinator: Matt House (1st season)
- Base defense: 4–3
- Home stadium: FIU Stadium

2015 Conference USA football standings
	Conf.			Overall
Team	W		L	W		L
East Division
No. 24 Western Kentucky x$	8	–	0	12	–	2
Middle Tennessee	6	–	2	7	–	6
Marshall	6	–	2	10	–	3
FIU	3	–	5	5	–	7
Old Dominion	3	–	5	5	–	7
Florida Atlantic	3	–	5	3	–	9
Charlotte*	0	–	8	2	–	10
West Division
Southern Miss x	7	–	1	9	–	5
Louisiana Tech	6	–	2	9	–	4
UTSA	3	–	5	3	–	9
UTEP	3	–	5	5	–	7
Rice	3	–	5	5	–	7
North Texas	1	–	7	1	–	11
Championship: Western Kentucky 45, Southern Miss 28
$ – Conference champion; x – Division champion/co-champions; * Ineligible for postseason bowl due to transition from FCS; As of January 12, 2015; Rankings from AP Poll

The 2015 FIU Panthers football team represented Florida International University (FIU) in the 2015 NCAA Division I FBS football season as members of the East Division of Conference USA. They were led by third-year head coach Ron Turner and played their home games at FIU Stadium in Miami, Florida. They finished the season 5–7, 3–5 in C-USA play to finish in a three way tie for fourth place in the East Division.

== Schedule ==
Florida International announced their 2015 football schedule on February 2, 2015. The 2015 schedule consisted of five home and seven away games in the regular season. The Panthers hosted CUSA foes Charlotte, Old Dominion, UTEP, and Western Kentucky (WKU), and traveled to Florida Atlantic, Louisiana Tech, Marshall, and Middle Tennessee.

Date	Time	Opponent	Site	TV	Result	Attendance
September 3	6:00 p.m.	at UCF*	Bright House Networks Stadium; Orlando, FL	CBSSN	W 15–14	39,184
September 12	8:00 p.m.	at Indiana*	Memorial Stadium; Bloomington, IN	BTN	L 22–36	41,509
September 19	6:00 p.m.	North Carolina Central*	FIU Stadium; Miami, FL		W 39–14	15,567
September 26	2:30 p.m.	at Louisiana Tech	Joe Aillet Stadium; Ruston, LA	FCS	L 17–27	20,010
October 3	3:00 p.m.	at UMass*	Warren McGuirk Alumni Stadium; Hadley, MA	ESPN3	L 14–24	13,525
October 10	12:00 p.m.	UTEP	FIU Stadium; Miami, FL	ASN	W 52–12	13,799
October 17	12:00 p.m.	at Middle Tennessee	Johnny "Red" Floyd Stadium; Murfreesboro, TN	FSN	L 34–42	13,227
October 24	6:00 p.m.	Old Dominion^{†}	FIU Stadium; Miami, FL		W 41–12	17,961
October 31	3:30 p.m.	at Florida Atlantic	FAU Stadium; Boca Raton, FL (Shula Bowl)	ASN	L 17–31	16,432
November 7	12:00 p.m.	Charlotte	FIU Stadium; Miami, FL	ASN	W 48–31	14,200
November 14	3:30 p.m.	at Marshall	Joan C. Edwards Stadium; Huntington, WV	FSN	L 0–52	26,572
November 21	2:30 p.m.	Western Kentucky	FIU Stadium; Miami, FL	FCS	L 7–63	14,380
*Non-conference game; ^{†}Homecoming; All times are in Eastern time

== Game summaries ==
=== At UCF ===
	1	2	3	4	Total
Panthers	3	0	6	6	15
Knights	7	7	0	0	14

=== At Indiana ===
	1	2	3	4	Total
Panthers	7	7	0	8	22
Hoosiers	0	13	6	17	36

=== North Carolina Central ===
	1	2	3	4	Total
Eagles	7	7	0	0	14
Panthers	12	14	13	0	39

=== At Louisiana Tech ===
	1	2	3	4	Total
Panthers	0	3	7	7	17
Bulldogs	7	10	0	10	27

=== At Massachusetts ===
	1	2	3	4	Total
Panthers	0	7	7	0	14
Minutemen	7	10	0	7	24

=== UTEP ===
	1	2	3	4	Total
Miners	0	3	7	2	12
Panthers	21	21	3	7	52

=== At Middle Tennessee ===
	1	2	3	4	Total
Panthers	9	7	3	15	34
Blue Raiders	7	21	7	7	42

=== Old Dominion ===
	1	2	3	4	Total
Monarchs	0	6	6	0	12
Panthers	7	10	10	14	41

=== At Florida Atlantic ===
	1	2	3	4	Total
Panthers	0	7	3	7	17
Owls	7	10	0	14	31

=== Charlotte ===
	1	2	3	4	Total
49ers	7	3	7	14	31
Panthers	14	20	7	7	48

=== At Marshall ===
	1	2	3	4	Total
Panthers	0	0	0	0	0
Thudering Herd	21	17	7	7	52

=== Western Kentucky ===
	1	2	3	4	Total
Hilltoppers	21	14	21	7	63
Panthers	0	0	0	7	7
