= 2015 Rice Owls football team =

American college football season

2015 Rice Owls football
- Conference: Conference USA
- West Division
- Record: 5–7 (3–5 C-USA)
- Head coach: David Bailiff (9th season)
- Offensive coordinator: Larry Edmondson (2nd season)
- Co-offensive coordinator: Billy Lynch (2nd season)
- Offensive scheme: Spread
- Defensive coordinator: Chris Thurmond (4th season)
- Base defense: 4–3
- Home stadium: Rice Stadium

2015 Conference USA football standings
	Conf.			Overall
Team	W		L	W		L
East Division
No. 24 Western Kentucky x$	8	–	0	12	–	2
Middle Tennessee	6	–	2	7	–	6
Marshall	6	–	2	10	–	3
FIU	3	–	5	5	–	7
Old Dominion	3	–	5	5	–	7
Florida Atlantic	3	–	5	3	–	9
Charlotte*	0	–	8	2	–	10
West Division
Southern Miss x	7	–	1	9	–	5
Louisiana Tech	6	–	2	9	–	4
UTSA	3	–	5	3	–	9
UTEP	3	–	5	5	–	7
Rice	3	–	5	5	–	7
North Texas	1	–	7	1	–	11
Championship: Western Kentucky 45, Southern Miss 28
$ – Conference champion; x – Division champion/co-champions; * Ineligible for postseason bowl due to transition from FCS; As of January 12, 2015; Rankings from AP Poll

The 2015 Rice Owls football team represented Rice University in the 2015 NCAA Division I FBS football season as members of the West Division of Conference USA. They were led by ninth year head coach David Bailiff and played their home games at Rice Stadium in Houston, Texas. They finished the season 5–7, 3–5 in C-USA play to finish in a three-way tie for third place in the West Division.

== Schedule ==
Rice announced their 2015 football schedule on February 2, 2015. The 2015 schedule consisted of six home and away games in the regular season. The Owls hosted CUSA foes Charlotte, Louisiana Tech, Southern Miss, and Western Kentucky (WKU), and traveled to Florida Atlantic, North Texas, UTEP, and UTSA.

Date	Time	Opponent	Site	TV	Result	Attendance
September 5	2:30 pm	Wagner*	Rice Stadium; Houston, TX	ASN	W 56–16	18,296
September 12	7:00 pm	at Texas*	Darrell K Royal–Texas Memorial Stadium; Austin, TX	LHN	L 28–42	86,458
September 19	1:30 pm	at North Texas	Apogee Stadium; Denton, TX	FCS Central	W 38–24	19,602
September 26	2:00 pm	at No. 5 Baylor*	McLane Stadium; Waco, TX	FSN/FCS Central	L 17–70	43,619
October 3	2:30 pm	Western Kentucky	Rice Stadium; Houston, TX	FSN	L 10–49	20,124
October 10	1:30 pm	at Florida Atlantic	FAU Stadium; Boca Raton, FL	FCS	W 27–26	13,191
October 24	11:00 am	Army*	Rice Stadium; Houston, TX	FSN	W 38–31	24,409
October 30	7:00 pm	Louisiana Tech	Rice Stadium; Houston, TX	FS1	L 17–42	18,010
November 6	7:00 pm	at UTEP	Sun Bowl; El Paso, TX	CBSSN	L 21–24	23,031
November 14	2:30 pm	Southern Miss^{†}	Rice Stadium; Houston, TX	ASN	L 10–65	18,656
November 21	6:00 pm	at UTSA	Alamodome; San Antonio, TX	ASN	L 24–34	20,437
November 28	2:30 pm	Charlotte	Rice Stadium; Houston, TX	ASN	W 27–7	16,539
*Non-conference game; ^{†}Homecoming; Rankings from AP Poll released prior to game; All times are in Central time

Schedule source:

== Game summaries ==
=== Wagner ===
	1	2	3	4	Total
Seahawks	3	0	6	7	16
Owls	14	21	7	14	56

=== At Texas ===
	1	2	3	4	Total
Owls	0	14	0	14	28
Longhorns	21	0	21	0	42

=== At North Texas ===
	1	2	3	4	Total
Owls	0	17	21	0	38
Mean Green	3	7	7	7	24

=== At Baylor ===
	1	2	3	4	Total
Owls	10	0	7	0	17
#5 Bears	21	21	21	7	70

=== WKU ===
	1	2	3	4	Total
Hilltoppers	21	14	0	14	49
Owls	3	7	0	0	10

=== At Florida Atlantic ===
	1	2	3	4	Total
Rice Owls	14	0	0	13	27
FAU Owls	7	7	6	6	26

=== Army ===
	1	2	3	4	Total
Black Knights	0	14	7	10	31
Owls	14	10	0	14	38

=== Louisiana Tech ===
	1	2	3	4	Total
Bulldogs	14	14	7	7	42
Owls	7	0	3	7	17

=== At UTEP ===
	1	2	3	4	Total
Owls	0	14	7	0	21
Miners	0	14	7	3	24

=== Southern Miss ===
	1	2	3	4	Total
Golden Eagles	7	35	10	13	65
Owls	0	0	0	10	10

=== At UTSA ===
	1	2	3	4	Total
Owls	10	7	7	0	24
Roadrunners	7	21	6	0	34

=== Charlotte ===
	1	2	3	4	Total
49ers	0	0	0	7	7
Owls	0	0	10	17	27
