= 2015 Middle Tennessee Blue Raiders football team =

American college football season

2015 Middle Tennessee Blue Raiders football

Bahamas Bowl, L 31–45 vs. Western Michigan
- Conference: Conference USA
- East Division
- Record: 7–6 (6–2 C-USA)
- Head coach: Rick Stockstill (10th season)
- Offensive coordinator: Buster Faulkner (4th season)
- Offensive scheme: Pro spread
- Co-defensive coordinators: Steve Ellis (5th season); Tyrone Nix (4th season)
- Base defense: 4–3
- Home stadium: Johnny "Red" Floyd Stadium

2015 Conference USA football standings
	Conf.			Overall
Team	W		L	W		L
East Division
No. 24 Western Kentucky x$	8	–	0	12	–	2
Middle Tennessee	6	–	2	7	–	6
Marshall	6	–	2	10	–	3
FIU	3	–	5	5	–	7
Old Dominion	3	–	5	5	–	7
Florida Atlantic	3	–	5	3	–	9
Charlotte*	0	–	8	2	–	10
West Division
Southern Miss x	7	–	1	9	–	5
Louisiana Tech	6	–	2	9	–	4
UTSA	3	–	5	3	–	9
UTEP	3	–	5	5	–	7
Rice	3	–	5	5	–	7
North Texas	1	–	7	1	–	11
Championship: Western Kentucky 45, Southern Miss 28
$ – Conference champion; x – Division champion/co-champions; * Ineligible for postseason bowl due to transition from FCS; As of January 12, 2015; Rankings from AP Poll

The 2015 Middle Tennessee Blue Raiders football team represented Middle Tennessee State University as a member of the East Division of Conference USA (C-USA) during the 2015 NCAA Division I FBS football season. Led by tenth-year head coach Rick Stockstill, the Blue Raiders compiled an overall record of 7–6 with a mark of 6–2 in conference play, tying for second place in the C-USA's East Division. Middle Tennessee was invited to the Bahamas Bowl, where they lost to Western Michigan. The team played home games at Johnny "Red" Floyd Stadium in Murfreesboro, Tennessee.

== Schedule ==
Middle Tennessee announced their 2015 football schedule on February 2, 2015. The 2015 schedule consisted of six home and six away games in the regular season.

Date	Time	Opponent	Site	TV	Result	Attendance
September 5	6:00 pm	Jackson State*	Johnny "Red" Floyd Stadium; Murfreesboro, TN	GBR	W 70–14	15,908
September 12	3:00 pm	at No. 2 Alabama*	Bryant–Denny Stadium; Tuscaloosa, AL	SECN	L 10–37	98,568
September 19	6:00 pm	Charlotte	Johnny "Red" Floyd Stadium; Murfreesboro, TN	GBR	W 73–14	16,030
September 26	3:00 pm	at Illinois*	Memorial Stadium; Champaign, IL	ESPNews	L 25–27	44,366
October 3	6:00 pm	Vanderbilt*^{†}	Johnny "Red" Floyd Stadium; Murfreesboro, TN	CBSSN	L 13–17	25,411
October 10	11:00 am	at Western Kentucky	Houchens Industries–L. T. Smith Stadium; Bowling Green, KY (100 Miles of Hate)	FSN	L 28–58	16,993
October 17	11:00 am	FIU	Johnny "Red" Floyd Stadium; Murfreesboro, TN	FSN	W 42–34	13,227
October 24	2:30 pm	at Louisiana Tech	Joe Aillet Stadium; Ruston, LA	FSN	L 16–45	15,024
November 7	2:30 pm	Marshall	Johnny "Red" Floyd Stadium; Murfreesboro, TN	FSN	W 27–24 ^{3OT}	18,760
November 14	11:00 am	at Florida Atlantic	FAU Stadium; Boca Raton, FL	ASN	W 24–17	13,233
November 21	11:00 am	North Texas	Johnny "Red" Floyd Stadium; Murfreesboro, TN	ASN	W 41–7	13,922
November 28	1:30 pm	at UTSA	Alamodome; San Antonio, TX	FCS	W 42–7	19,504
December 24	11:00 am	vs. Western Michigan*	Thomas Robinson Stadium; Nassau, Bahamas (Bahamas Bowl)	ESPN	L 31–45	13,123
*Non-conference game; ^{†}Homecoming; Rankings from AP Poll released prior to the game; All times are in Central time

== Game summaries ==
=== Jackson State ===
	1	2	3	4	Total
Tigers	0	14	0	0	14
Blue Raiders	14	28	14	14	70

=== At Alabama ===
	1	2	3	4	Total
Blue Raiders	0	3	0	7	10
#2 Crimson Tide	7	16	14	0	37

=== Charlotte ===
	1	2	3	4	Total
49ers	7	7	0	0	14
Blue Raiders	42	7	17	7	73

=== At Illinois ===
	1	2	3	4	Total
Blue Raiders	3	9	0	13	25
Fighting Illini	7	10	7	3	27

=== Vanderbilt ===
	1	2	3	4	Total
Commodores	3	0	0	14	17
Blue Raiders	3	3	0	7	13

=== At WKU ===
	1	2	3	4	Total
Blue Raiders	7	7	7	7	28
Hilltoppers	28	24	3	3	58

=== FIU ===
	1	2	3	4	Total
Panthers	9	7	3	15	34
Blue Raiders	7	21	7	7	42

=== At Louisiana Tech ===
	1	2	3	4	Total
Blue Raiders	7	3	0	6	16
Bulldogs	14	21	0	10	45

=== Marshall ===
	1	2	3	4	OT	2OT	3OT	Total
Thundering Herd	7	0	0	10	7	0	0	24
Blue Raiders	0	7	10	0	7	0	3	27

=== At Florida Atlantic ===
	1	2	3	4	Total
Blue Raiders	10	7	7	0	24
Owls	7	7	3	0	17

=== North Texas ===
	1	2	3	4	Total
Mean Green	0	7	0	0	7
Blue Raiders	14	17	10	0	41

=== At UTSA ===
	1	2	3	4	Total
Blue Raiders	7	14	14	7	42
Roadrunners	0	0	0	7	7

=== vs Western Michigan–Bahamas Bowl ===
	1	2	3	4	Total
Blue Raiders	17	0	7	7	31
Broncos	17	0	7	21	45

== After the season ==
=== NFL draft ===
The following Blue Raider was selected in the 2016 NFL draft following the season.

Round	Pick	Player	Position	NFL club
3	64	Kevin Byard	Defensive back	Tennessee Titans
