= 2015 Old Dominion Monarchs football team =

American college football season

2015 Old Dominion Monarchs football
- Conference: Conference USA
- East Division
- Record: 5–7 (3–5 C-USA)
- Head coach: Bobby Wilder (7th season)
- Offensive coordinator: Brian Scott (7th season)
- Offensive scheme: Hurry-up spread option
- Defensive coordinator: Rich Nagy (3rd season)
- Base defense: 3–3–5
- Home stadium: Foreman Field at S. B. Ballard Stadium

2015 Conference USA football standings
	Conf.			Overall
Team	W		L	W		L
East Division
No. 24 Western Kentucky x$	8	–	0	12	–	2
Middle Tennessee	6	–	2	7	–	6
Marshall	6	–	2	10	–	3
FIU	3	–	5	5	–	7
Old Dominion	3	–	5	5	–	7
Florida Atlantic	3	–	5	3	–	9
Charlotte*	0	–	8	2	–	10
West Division
Southern Miss x	7	–	1	9	–	5
Louisiana Tech	6	–	2	9	–	4
UTSA	3	–	5	3	–	9
UTEP	3	–	5	5	–	7
Rice	3	–	5	5	–	7
North Texas	1	–	7	1	–	11
Championship: Western Kentucky 45, Southern Miss 28
$ – Conference champion; x – Division champion/co-champions; * Ineligible for postseason bowl due to transition from FCS; As of January 12, 2015; Rankings from AP Poll

The 2015 Old Dominion Monarchs football team represented Old Dominion University in the 2015 NCAA Division I FBS football season. They were led by seventh-year head coach Bobby Wilder and played their home games at Foreman Field at S. B. Ballard Stadium in Norfolk, Virginia. They were members of the East Division of Conference USA. 2015 was the first year Old Dominion was a full member of the NCAA Division I Football Bowl Subdivision (FBS) and eligible for postseason play. They finished the season 5–7, 3–5 in C-USA play to finish in a three-way tie for fourth place in the East Division.

== Personnel ==
=== Coaching staff ===
2015 Old Dominion Monarch coaches

Head coach

- Bobby Wilder

Assistant coaches

- Brian Scott – Offensive coordinator
- Rich Nagy – Defensive coordinator and Linebackers coach
- Bill Dee – Offensive line coach
- Sam Perryman – Cornerbacks coach
- Michael Zyskowski – Special teams and running back coach/recruiting coordinator
- Arick Forest – Wide receivers coach
- Jeff Comissiong – Assistant head coach/defensive line coach
- Ron Whitcomb – Quarterbacks coach
- Kermit Buggs – Safeties coach
- Jordan Orlovsky – Graduate assistant/linebackers
- Kyle Jolly – Graduate assistant/offensive line

== Roster ==
2015 Old Dominion Monarchs
Quarterback: 19 Shuler Bentley – (redshirt) freshman (6'1, 209); 11 Blake LaRussa – freshman (5'10, 185); 14 Joey Verhaegh – sophomore (6'1, 201); 17 Colin McElroy – junior (6'0, 189); Running back: 37 Justin Cooper – (redshirt) freshman (5'11, 213); 34 Jeremy Cox – freshman (5'11, 208); 35 Nick Ferrari-Smith – freshman (5'9, 185); 28 Malik Fuller – (redshirt) freshman (5'9, 168); Gemonta jackson – freshman (5'10, 185); 33 Ray Lawry – sophomore (5'10, 205); 4 Vincent Lowe – sophomore (5'9, 175); 39 Latrell Sandifer – (redshirt) freshman (5'7, 153); 27 Brandon Simmons – sophomore (5'9, 191); Kesean strong – freshman (5'10, 185); Wide receiver: 48 T.J. Boothe – sophomore (6'2, 223); 81 R.J Brown – sophomore (6'0, 197); 9 Johnathan Duhart – sophomore (6'3, 211); 7 Nick England – junior (6'0, 180); 86 Travis Fulgham – (redshirt) freshman (6'3, 205); Klye goddard – freshman (5'10, 180); 15 Isaiah Harper – (redshirt) freshman (5'9, 166); Eri'Reon Hayes – freshman (6'2, 190); 82 Will Howard – (redshirt) freshman (6'3, 197); 2 Marques Little – sophomore (5'9, 180); 6 Zach Pascal – junior (6'2, 217); Hassan patterson – freshman (6'2, 185); 83 Quintin Reynolds – (redshirt) freshman (6'0, 185); 8 Blair Roberts – (redshirt) senior (6'2, 203); 1 Melvin Vaughn – junior (6'2, 248); 10 David Washington – junior (6'3, 209); Tight end: 88 Adam Swann – (redshirt) freshman (6'5, 241); Nijee cox – freshman (6'3, 235)	Offensive line: 66 Troy Bulter – junior (6'3, 320); 76 Tyler Compton – junior (6'4, 297); 70 Tyler Fisher – junior (6'3, 323); 75 Eric Hampson – sophomore (6'5, 284); 61 Eli Kessner – sophomore (6'2, 300); 63 Nick Clark – (redshirt) freshman (6'4, 301); 78 Darius Garcia – sophomore (6'3, 311); Devin hannan – freshman (6'4, 275); 73 Chad Hendricks – (redshirt) freshman (6'6, 274); 72 Raul Martinez – junior (6'5, 285); 77 Manuel Matiarena – (redshirt) sophomore (6'4, 299); Hunter sosebee – freshman (6'7, 275); 69 Ely Anderson – (redshirt) senior (6'6, 290); 74 Tony Barnett – freshman (6'4, 292); 65 Tyler Burns – (redshirt) senior (6'6, 370); 53 Casey Cullen – sophomore (6'4, 288); 67 Davis Farmer – sophomore (6'5, 331); 68 Andrew Maddox – junior (6'5, 286); 71 Connor Mewbourne – (redshirt) senior (6'4, 287); Defensive line: 99 Daniel Appouh – (redshirt) freshman (6'4, 247); 95 Poncho Barnwell – senior (6'4, 270); 92 Jude Brenya – junior (6'3, 262); 96 Terell Reid – junior (6'2, 277); 90 Tim Ward – freshman (6'6, 218); 94 Scott Wiggins – junior (6'3, 237); 98 Oshane Ximines – (redshirt) freshman (6'3, 239); 50 Torrez Wentz – (redshirt) freshman (6'2, 281); 57 Rashaad Coward – junior (6'5, 297); 59 Galen Evans – (redshirt) junior (6'3, 299); Miles Fox – freshman (6'1, 270); 79 Ryan Londree – (redshirt) freshman (6'3, 271); 58 Bunmi Rotimi – sophomore (6'4, 283); Mufu taiwo – freshman (6'5, 250); 54 Pat Toal – (redshirt) freshman (6'4, 316); 93 Brandon Tyson – (redshirt) freshman (6'1, 345); Linebacker: 43 Kohl Adams-Hurd – senior (6'3, 239); Casey bernard – freshman (6'2, 222); 37 Marvin Branch – (redshirt) freshman (6'2, 227); 41 Jaylin Jefferies – freshman (6'0, 228); 28 Malique Johnson – senior (6'2, 216); A.J. Oneal – freshman (6'3, 210); 47 T.J. Ricks – junior (6'0, 226); 44 Reece Schmidt – senior (6'3, 246); 36 Martez Simpson – senior (6'1, 222); 38 Richard Thomas – junior (6'0, 227); 42 Derek Wilder – freshman (6'1, 242); 45 Shadow Williams – junior (6'0, 218); 35 Anthony Wilson – junior (6'1, 221); 40 Isaiah Worthy – sophomore (6'1, 235)	Defensive back: Jamez brickhouse – freshman (5'10, 165); 19 Devon Brown – junior (5'11, 180); 16 Lawrence Holley – (redshirt) freshman (6'2, 205); 20 Rob Thompson – (redshirt) sophomore (6'1, 217); 14 Aquante Thornton – (redshirt) senior (5'9, 170); 27 Aaron Young – junior (5'11, 188); 48 Brandon Addison – (redshirt) freshman (5'10, 173); 34 Andre Bernhard – sophomore (6'2, 192); Jelani carter – freshman (6'1, 190); 10 Sean Carter – (redshirt) freshman (6'1, 199); 18 Jordan Glover – (redshirt) freshman (5'11, 177); Kane miskel – freshman (6'2, 175); 3 C.J. Bradshaw – junior (5'10, 187); 12 Chrisian Byrum – sophomore (6'1, 186); 13 Justice Davila – sophomore (6'0, 191); 81 Keenan McUmber – (redshirt) freshman (6'0, 182); 24 Fellonte Misher – senior (6'2, 214); 21 Justin Noye – (redshirt) freshman (6'1, 202); Denzel williams – freshman (6'2, 200); Special teams: 29 Dalton Fraser – sophomore (6'0, 196) (PK); 38 Ricky Segers – (redshirt) junior (5'11, 206) (PK); 29 Joseph Pulisic – junior (5'9, 175) (P); 49 Adam Vaught – (redshirt) freshman (6'6, 258) (LS); 39 Jarrett Cervi – sophomore (6'1, 219) (PK/P); 15 Satchel Ziffer – junior (6'4, 206) (PK/P)

== Schedule ==
Old Dominion announced their 2015 football schedule on February 2, 2015. The 2015 schedule consisted of seven home and five away games in the regular season. The Monarchs hosted CUSA foes Charlotte, Florida Atlantic, UTEP, and Western Kentucky (WKU), and traveled to Florida International (FIU), Marshall, Southern Miss, and UTSA.

Date	Time	Opponent	Site	TV	Result	Attendance
September 5	3:30 p.m.	at Eastern Michigan*	Rynearson Stadium; Ypsilanti, MI	ASN	W 38–34	6,474
September 12	7:00 p.m.	Norfolk State*	Foreman Field; Norfolk, VA (rivalry)	ASN	W 24–10	20,118
September 19	7:00 p.m.	NC State*	Foreman Field; Norfolk, VA	ASN	L 14–38	20,118
September 26	3:30 p.m.	Appalachian State*	Foreman Field; Norfolk, VA	ASN	L 0–49	20,118
October 3	3:30 p.m.	at Marshall	Joan C. Edwards Stadium; Huntington, WV	ASN	L 7–27	18,473
October 17	3:30 p.m.	Charlotte^{†}	Foreman Field; Norfolk, VA	ASN	W 37–34	20,118
October 24	6:00 p.m.	at FIU	FIU Stadium; Miami, FL		L 12–41	17,961
October 31	11:00 a.m.	Western Kentucky	Foreman Field; Norfolk, VA	FSN	L 30–55	20,118
November 7	7:00 p.m.	at UTSA	Alamodome; San Antonio, TX	ASN	W 36–31	19,586
November 14	12:00 p.m.	UTEP	Foreman Field; Norfolk, VA	FSN	W 31–21	20,118
November 21	3:30 p.m.	at Southern Miss	M. M. Roberts Stadium; Hattiesburg, MS	ASN	L 31–56	29,568
November 28	12:00 p.m.	Florida Atlantic	Foreman Field; Norfolk, VA (Oyster Bowl)	ASN	L 31–33	20,118
*Non-conference game; ^{†}Homecoming; All times are in Eastern time

Schedule source:

== Game summaries ==
=== Eastern Michigan ===
	1	2	3	4	Total
Monarchs	7	3	21	7	38
Eagles	14	3	14	3	34

=== Norfolk State ===
	1	2	3	4	Total
Spartans	0	10	0	0	10
Monarchs	7	7	7	3	24

=== NC State ===
	1	2	3	4	Total
Wolfpack	7	14	7	10	38
Monarchs	0	7	7	0	14

=== Appalachian State ===
	1	2	3	4	Total
Mountaineers	7	28	14	0	49
Monarchs	0	0	0	0	0

=== Marshall ===
	1	2	3	4	Total
Monarchs	0	0	0	7	7
Thundering Herd	7	7	7	6	27

=== Charlotte ===
	1	2	3	4	Total
49ers	14	10	0	10	34
Monarchs	6	6	10	15	37

=== FIU ===
	1	2	3	4	Total
Monarchs	0	6	6	0	12
Panthers	7	10	10	14	41

=== Western Kentucky ===
	1	2	3	4	Total
Hilltoppers	10	21	10	14	55
Monarchs	3	7	7	13	30

=== UTSA ===
	1	2	3	4	Total
Monarchs	3	13	7	13	36
Roadrunners	14	0	7	10	31

=== UTEP ===
	1	2	3	4	Total
Miners	9	6	0	6	21
Monarchs	3	14	7	7	31

=== Southern Miss ===
	1	2	3	4	Total
Monarchs	7	10	14	0	31
Golden Eagles	14	0	28	14	56

=== Florida Atlantic ===
	1	2	3	4	Total
Owls	14	10	3	6	33
Monarchs	3	7	21	0	31
