= 2015 UTEP Miners football team =

American college football season

2015 UTEP Miners football
- Conference: Conference USA
- West Division
- Record: 5–7 (3–5 C-USA)
- Head coach: Sean Kugler (3rd season)
- Offensive coordinator: Patrick Higgins (3rd season)
- Offensive scheme: Pro spread
- Defensive coordinator: Scott Stoker (3rd season)
- Base defense: 3–3–5
- Home stadium: Sun Bowl

2015 Conference USA football standings
	Conf.			Overall
Team	W		L	W		L
East Division
No. 24 Western Kentucky x$	8	–	0	12	–	2
Middle Tennessee	6	–	2	7	–	6
Marshall	6	–	2	10	–	3
FIU	3	–	5	5	–	7
Old Dominion	3	–	5	5	–	7
Florida Atlantic	3	–	5	3	–	9
Charlotte*	0	–	8	2	–	10
West Division
Southern Miss x	7	–	1	9	–	5
Louisiana Tech	6	–	2	9	–	4
UTSA	3	–	5	3	–	9
UTEP	3	–	5	5	–	7
Rice	3	–	5	5	–	7
North Texas	1	–	7	1	–	11
Championship: Western Kentucky 45, Southern Miss 28
$ – Conference champion; x – Division champion/co-champions; * Ineligible for postseason bowl due to transition from FCS; As of January 12, 2015; Rankings from AP Poll

The 2015 UTEP Miners football team represented the University of Texas at El Paso (UTEP) as a member of the West Division in Conference USA (C-USA) during the 2015 NCAA Division I FCS football season. Led by third-year head coach Sean Kugler, the Miners compiled an overall record of 5–7 with a mark of 3–5 in conference play, placing in a three-way tie for third in C-USA's West Division. The team played home games at the Sun Bowl in El Paso, Texas.

UTEP averaged 23,212 fans per game.

== Schedule ==
UTEP announced their 2015 football schedule on February 2, 2015. The schedule consisted of five home and seven away games.

Date	Time	Opponent	Site	TV	Result	Attendance
September 5	1:30 pm	at No. 18 Arkansas*	Donald W. Reynolds Razorback Stadium; Fayetteville, AR (SEC Nation)	ESPNU	L 13–48	67,708
September 12	1:00 pm	at Texas Tech*	Jones AT&T Stadium; Lubbock, TX	FSN, FCS Central	L 20–69	54,090
September 19	6:00 pm	at New Mexico State*	Aggie Memorial Stadium; Las Cruces, NM (Battle of I-10)	Aggie Vision, ESPN3	W 50–47 ^{OT}	17,210
September 26	6:00 pm	Incarnate Word*	Sun Bowl; El Paso, TX		W 27–17	22,322
October 3	6:00 pm	UTSA^{†}	Sun Bowl; El Paso, TX		L 6–25	25,951
October 10	10:00 am	at FIU	FIU Stadium; Miami, FL	ASN	L 12–52	13,799
October 24	5:00 pm	Florida Atlantic	Sun Bowl; El Paso, TX	ASN	W 27–17	22,468
October 31	12:30 pm	at Southern Miss	M. M. Roberts Stadium; Hattiesburg, MS	FCS	L 13–34	25,581
November 6	6:00 pm	Rice	Sun Bowl; El Paso, TX	CBSSN	W 24–21	23,031
November 14	10:00 am	at Old Dominion	Foreman Field; Norfolk, VA	FSN	L 21–31	20,118
November 21	1:30 pm	Louisiana Tech	Sun Bowl; El Paso, TX	FSN	L 15–17	22,286
November 28	1:30 pm	at North Texas	Apogee Stadium; Denton, TX	FSN	W 20–17	8,305
*Non-conference game; ^{†}Homecoming; Rankings from AP Poll released prior to the game; All times are in Mountain time

== Game summaries ==
=== At Arkansas ===
	1	2	3	4	Total
Miners	0	10	3	0	13
#18 Razorbacks	14	14	17	3	48

=== At Texas Tech ===
	1	2	3	4	Total
Miners	7	10	0	3	20
Red Raiders	17	21	17	14	69

=== At New Mexico State ===
	1	2	3	4	OT	Total
Miners	9	0	7	28	6	50
Aggies	13	3	14	14	3	47

=== Incarnate Word ===
	1	2	3	4	Total
Cardinals	3	7	7	0	17
Miners	7	3	7	10	27

=== UTSA ===
	1	2	3	4	Total
Roadrunners	0	3	15	7	25
Miners	0	0	0	6	6

=== At FIU ===
	1	2	3	4	Total
Miners	0	3	7	2	12
Panthers	21	21	3	7	52

=== Florida Atlantic ===
	1	2	3	4	Total
FAU Owls	0	17	0	0	17
Miners	7	7	7	6	27

=== At Southern Miss ===
	1	2	3	4	Total
Miners	0	3	3	7	13
Golden Eagles	7	6	7	14	34

=== Rice ===
	1	2	3	4	Total
Rice Owls	0	14	7	0	21
Miners	0	14	7	3	24

=== At Old Dominion ===
	1	2	3	4	Total
Miners	9	6	0	6	21
Monarchs	3	14	7	7	31

=== Louisiana Tech ===
	1	2	3	4	Total
Bulldogs	3	7	7	0	17
Miners	0	10	2	3	15

=== At North Texas ===
	1	2	3	4	Total
Miners	0	0	13	7	20
Mean Green	3	0	14	0	17
