= 2015 Louisiana Tech Bulldogs football team =

American college football season

2015 Louisiana Tech Bulldogs football

New Orleans Bowl champion

New Orleans Bowl, W 47–28 vs. Arkansas State
- Conference: Conference USA
- West Division
- Record: 9–4 (6–2 C-USA)
- Head coach: Skip Holtz (3rd season)
- Offensive coordinator: Tony Petersen (3rd season)
- Offensive scheme: Multiple
- Defensive coordinator: Blake Baker (1st season)
- Base defense: 4–3
- Home stadium: Joe Aillet Stadium

2015 Conference USA football standings
	Conf.			Overall
Team	W		L	W		L
East Division
No. 24 Western Kentucky x$	8	–	0	12	–	2
Middle Tennessee	6	–	2	7	–	6
Marshall	6	–	2	10	–	3
FIU	3	–	5	5	–	7
Old Dominion	3	–	5	5	–	7
Florida Atlantic	3	–	5	3	–	9
Charlotte*	0	–	8	2	–	10
West Division
Southern Miss x	7	–	1	9	–	5
Louisiana Tech	6	–	2	9	–	4
UTSA	3	–	5	3	–	9
UTEP	3	–	5	5	–	7
Rice	3	–	5	5	–	7
North Texas	1	–	7	1	–	11
Championship: Western Kentucky 45, Southern Miss 28
$ – Conference champion; x – Division champion/co-champions; * Ineligible for postseason bowl due to transition from FCS; As of January 12, 2015; Rankings from AP Poll

The 2015 Louisiana Tech Bulldogs football team represented Louisiana Tech University in the 2015 NCAA Division I FBS football season as members of the West Division of Conference USA. They were led by third-year head coach Skip Holtz and played their home games at Joe Aillet Stadium in Ruston, Louisiana. They finished the season 9–4, 6–2 in C-USA play to finish in second place in the West Division. They were invited to the New Orleans Bowl where they defeated Arkansas State.

== Schedule ==
Louisiana Tech announced its 2015 football schedule on February 2, 2015. The schedule consisted of six home and six away games in the regular season.

Date	Time	Opponent	Site	TV	Result	Attendance
September 5	6:00 pm	Southern*	Joe Aillet Stadium; Ruston, LA	ASN	W 62–15	27,905
September 10	7:00 pm	at Western Kentucky	Houchens Industries–L. T. Smith Stadium; Bowling Green, KY	FS1	L 38–41	17,515
September 19	2:00 pm	at Kansas State*	Bill Snyder Family Football Stadium; Manhattan, KS	FSN	L 33–39 ^{3OT}	53,540
September 26	1:30 pm	FIU	Joe Aillet Stadium; Ruston, LA	FCS	W 27–17	20,010
October 3	6:00 pm	Louisiana–Lafayette*	Joe Aillet Stadium; Ruston, LA	ASN	W 43–14	26,910
October 10	6:00 pm	at UTSA	Alamodome; San Antonio, TX	ASN	W 34–31	24,392
October 17	11:00 am	at Mississippi State*	Davis Wade Stadium; Starkville, MS	SECN	L 20–45	61,651
October 24	2:30 pm	Middle Tennessee	Joe Aillet Stadium; Ruston, LA	FSN	W 45–16	15,024
October 30	7:00 pm	at Rice	Rice Stadium; Houston, TX	FS1	W 42–17	18,010
November 7	2:30 pm	North Texas^{†}	Joe Aillet Stadium; Ruston, LA	FCS	W 56–13	16,986
November 21	2:30 pm	at UTEP	Sun Bowl; El Paso, TX	FSN	W 17–15	22,286
November 28	11:00 am	Southern Miss	Joe Aillet Stadium; Ruston, LA (Rivalry in Dixie)	FSN	L 24–58	19,028
December 19	8:00 pm	vs. Arkansas State*	Mercedes-Benz Superdome; New Orleans, LA (New Orleans Bowl)	ESPN	W 47–28	32,847
*Non-conference game; ^{†}Homecoming; All times are in Central time

== Game summaries ==
=== Southern ===
	1	2	3	4	Total
Jaguars	8	0	7	0	15
Bulldogs	24	28	7	3	62

=== At Western Kentucky ===
	1	2	3	4	Total
Bulldogs	0	17	7	14	38
Hilltoppers	14	13	11	3	41

=== At Kansas State ===
	1	2	3	4	OT	Total
Bulldogs	0	10	3	10	10	33
Wildcats	3	3	7	10	16	39

=== FIU ===
	1	2	3	4	Total
Panthers	0	3	7	7	17
Bulldogs	7	10	0	10	27

=== Louisiana–Lafayette ===
	1	2	3	4	Total
Ragin' Cajuns	7	0	7	0	14
Bulldogs	7	22	7	7	43

=== At UTSA ===
	1	2	3	4	Total
Bulldogs	10	14	7	3	34
Roadrunners	3	7	14	7	31

=== At Mississippi State ===
	1	2	3	4	Total
LT Bulldogs	14	3	3	0	20
MSU Bulldogs	7	17	14	7	45

=== Middle Tennessee ===
	1	2	3	4	Total
Blue Raiders	7	3	0	6	16
Bulldogs	14	21	0	10	45

=== At Rice ===
	1	2	3	4	Total
Bulldogs	14	14	7	7	42
Owls	7	0	3	7	17

=== North Texas ===
	1	2	3	4	Total
Mean Green	0	0	0	13	13
Bulldogs	21	7	14	14	56

=== At Texas–El Paso ===
	1	2	3	4	Total
Bulldogs	3	7	7	0	17
Miners	0	10	2	3	15

=== Southern Miss ===
	1	2	3	4	Total
Golden Eagles	7	17	7	27	58
Bulldogs	3	7	7	7	24

=== Arkansas State–New Orleans Bowl ===
	1	2	3	4	Total
Red Wolves	3	14	3	8	28
Bulldogs	10	7	17	13	47

== NFL draft ==
Rnd.	Pick	Team	Player	Pos.	College	Notes
1	30	Carolina Panthers	Vernon Butler	DT	Louisiana Tech	
4	134	Baltimore Ravens	Kenneth Dixon	RB	Louisiana Tech	
6	207	San Francisco 49ers	Jeff Driskel	QB	Louisiana Tech	
