= 2015 Conference USA football season =

- League: NCAA Division I Football Bowl Subdivision
- Sport: Football
- Duration: September 3, 2015 through December 26, 2015
- Teams: 13
- TV partner(s): Fox Sports, CBS Sports Network, ESPN, American Sports Network

2016 NFL Draft
- Top draft pick: Vernon Butler (Louisiana Tech)
- Picked by: Carolina Panthers, 30th overall

Regular season
- Season MVP: QB Brandon Doughty, WKU
- East champions: Western Kentucky
- West champions: Southern Miss

Championship Game
- Champions: Western Kentucky
- Runners-up: Southern Miss
- Finals MVP: QB Brandon Doughty, WKU

Football seasons
- ← 2014 2016 →

2015 Conference USA football standings
	Conf.			Overall
Team	W		L	W		L
East Division
No. 24 Western Kentucky x$	8	–	0	12	–	2
Middle Tennessee	6	–	2	7	–	6
Marshall	6	–	2	10	–	3
FIU	3	–	5	5	–	7
Old Dominion	3	–	5	5	–	7
Florida Atlantic	3	–	5	3	–	9
Charlotte*	0	–	8	2	–	10
West Division
Southern Miss x	7	–	1	9	–	5
Louisiana Tech	6	–	2	9	–	4
UTSA	3	–	5	3	–	9
UTEP	3	–	5	5	–	7
Rice	3	–	5	5	–	7
North Texas	1	–	7	1	–	11
Championship: Western Kentucky 45, Southern Miss 28
$ – Conference champion; x – Division champion/co-champions; * Ineligible for postseason bowl due to transition from FCS; As of January 12, 2015; Rankings from AP Poll

The 2015 Conference USA football season was part of the 2015 NCAA Division I FBS football season and played from August 2015 through January 2016. The 2015 football season marked the 21st season of the Conference USA's existence and 20th of football competition; although C-USA was established in 1995, it did not begin football competition until 1996.

== Membership ==
The Charlotte 49ers were a transitional Division I FBS member, joining from the FCS Atlantic 10 Conference. They replaced UAB in the East division for the 2015 season.

East Division	West Division
Charlotte	Louisiana Tech
Florida Atlantic	North Texas
FIU	Rice
Marshall	Southern Miss
Middle Tennessee	UTEP
Old Dominion	UTSA
Western Kentucky	
