= 2015 Western Kentucky Hilltoppers football team =

American college football season

2015 Western Kentucky Hilltoppers football

C-USA champion C-USA East Division champion Miami Beach Bowl champion

C-USA Championship Game, W 45–28 vs. Southern Miss

Miami Beach Bowl, W 45–35 vs. South Florida
- Conference: Conference USA
- East Division

Ranking
- AP: No. 24
- Record: 12–2 (8–0 C-USA)
- Head coach: Jeff Brohm (2nd season)
- Offensive coordinator: Tyson Helton (2nd season)
- Offensive scheme: Multiple
- Defensive coordinator: Nick Holt (3rd season)
- Base defense: 4–3
- Home stadium: Houchens Industries–L. T. Smith Stadium

2015 Conference USA football standings
	Conf.			Overall
Team	W		L	W		L
East Division
No. 24 Western Kentucky x$	8	–	0	12	–	2
Middle Tennessee	6	–	2	7	–	6
Marshall	6	–	2	10	–	3
FIU	3	–	5	5	–	7
Old Dominion	3	–	5	5	–	7
Florida Atlantic	3	–	5	3	–	9
Charlotte*	0	–	8	2	–	10
West Division
Southern Miss x	7	–	1	9	–	5
Louisiana Tech	6	–	2	9	–	4
UTSA	3	–	5	3	–	9
UTEP	3	–	5	5	–	7
Rice	3	–	5	5	–	7
North Texas	1	–	7	1	–	11
Championship: Western Kentucky 45, Southern Miss 28
$ – Conference champion; x – Division champion/co-champions; * Ineligible for postseason bowl due to transition from FCS; As of January 12, 2015; Rankings from AP Poll

The 2015 Western Kentucky Hilltoppers football team represented Western Kentucky University (WKU) in the 2015 NCAA Division I FBS football season as members of the East Division of Conference USA. Led by second year head coach Jeff Brohm, they played their home games at Houchens Industries–L. T. Smith Stadium in Bowling Green, Kentucky. They finished the season 12–2, 8–0 in C-USA play to be champions of the East Division. They represented the East Division in the Conference USA Football Championship Game where they defeated Southern Miss to win their first ever C-USA championship. They were invited to the Miami Beach Bowl where they defeated South Florida. They led the NCAA in Passing Efficiency, tied the school record for victories and were also ranked in the FBS AP Top 25 for the first time in program history.

== Schedule ==
Western Kentucky announced their 2015 football schedule on February 2, 2015. The 2015 schedule consist of five home and seven away games in the regular season. The Hilltoppers will host CUSA foes Florida Atlantic, Louisiana Tech, Marshall, and Middle Tennessee, and will travel to Florida International (FIU), North Texas, Old Dominion, and Rice.

Date	Time	Opponent	Rank	Site	TV	Result	Attendance
September 3	7:00 p.m.	at Vanderbilt*		Vanderbilt Stadium; Nashville, TN	SECN	W 14–12	30,307
September 10	7:00 p.m.	Louisiana Tech		Houchens Industries–L. T. Smith Stadium; Bowling Green, KY	FS1	W 41–38	17,515
September 19	3:00 p.m.	at Indiana*		Memorial Stadium; Bloomington, IN	ESPNews	L 35–38	44,823
September 26	2:30 p.m.	Miami (OH)*		Houchens Industries–L. T. Smith Stadium; Bowling Green, KY	CBSSN	W 56–14	20,320
October 3	2:30 p.m.	at Rice		Rice Stadium; Houston, TX	FSN	W 49–10	20,124
October 10	11:00 a.m.	Middle Tennessee		Houchens Industries–L. T. Smith Stadium; Bowling Green, KY (100 Miles of Hate)	FSN	W 58–28	16,993
October 15	6:30 p.m.	at North Texas		Apogee Stadium; Denton, TX	CBSSN	W 55–28	10,155
October 24	6:00 p.m.	at No. 5 LSU*		Tiger Stadium; Baton Rouge, LA	ESPNU	L 20–48	101,561
October 31	11:00 a.m.	at Old Dominion		Foreman Field; Norfolk, VA	FSN	W 55–30	20,118
November 7	11:00 a.m.	Florida Atlantic^{†}		Houchens Industries–L. T. Smith Stadium; Bowling Green, KY	FSN	W 35–19	18,421
November 21	1:30 p.m.	at FIU		FIU Stadium; Miami, FL	FCS	W 63–7	14,380
November 27	11:00 a.m.	Marshall		Houchens Industries–L. T. Smith Stadium; Bowling Green, KY	FS1	W 49–28	17,687
December 5	11:00 a.m.	Southern Miss		Houchens Industries–L. T. Smith Stadium; Bowling Green, KY (Conference USA Championship Game)	ESPN2	W 45–28	16,823
December 21	1:30 p.m.	vs. South Florida*	No. 25	Marlins Park; Miami, FL (Miami Beach Bowl)	ESPN	W 45–35	21,712
*Non-conference game; ^{†}Homecoming; Rankings from AP Poll released prior to the game; All times are in Central time

== Rankings ==
Ranking movements Legend: ██ Increase in ranking ██ Decrease in ranking — = Not ranked RV = Received votes
	Week															
Poll	Pre	1	2	3	4	5	6	7	8	9	10	11	12	13	14	Final
AP	RV	RV	RV	—	—	—	RV	RV	—	—	RV	RV	RV	RV	25	24
Coaches	—	—	RV	—	—	—	—	RV	—	RV	RV	RV	RV	RV	RV	RV
CFP	Not released									—	—	—	—	—	—	Not released

== Game summaries ==
=== At Vanderbilt ===
	1	2	3	4	Total
Hilltoppers	0	0	7	7	14
Commodores	0	3	0	9	12

=== Louisiana Tech ===
	1	2	3	4	Total
Bulldogs	0	17	7	14	38
Hilltoppers	14	13	11	3	41

=== At Indiana ===
	1	2	3	4	Total
Hilltoppers	7	21	0	7	35
Hoosiers	7	10	21	0	38

=== Miami (OH) ===
	1	2	3	4	Total
RedHawks	0	7	0	7	14
Hilltoppers	21	28	0	7	56

=== At Rice ===
	1	2	3	4	Total
Hilltoppers	21	14	0	14	49
Owls	3	7	0	0	10

=== Middle Tennessee ===
	1	2	3	4	Total
Blue Raiders	7	7	7	7	28
Hilltoppers	28	24	3	3	58

=== At North Texas ===
	1	2	3	4	Total
Hilltoppers	14	20	14	7	55
Mean Green	0	14	0	14	28

=== At LSU ===
	1	2	3	4	Total
Hilltoppers	0	7	6	7	20
#5 Tigers	7	7	20	14	48

=== At Old Dominion ===
	1	2	3	4	Total
Hilltoppers	10	21	10	14	55
Monarchs	3	7	7	13	30

=== Florida Atlantic ===
	1	2	3	4	Total
Owls	7	6	6	0	19
Hilltoppers	0	14	14	7	35

=== At Florida International ===
	1	2	3	4	Total
Hilltoppers	21	14	21	7	63
Panthers	0	0	0	7	7

=== Marshall ===
	1	2	3	4	Total
Thundering Herd	0	14	7	7	28
Hilltoppers	7	28	6	8	49

=== Southern Miss (C–USA Championship Game) ===
	1	2	3	4	Total
Golden Eagles	7	14	7	0	28
Hilltoppers	7	14	10	14	45

=== South Florida (Miami Beach Bowl) ===
	1	2	3	4	Total
#25 Hilltoppers	0	10	28	7	45
Bulls	7	7	7	14	35
