= T. J. Rives =

Radio sportscaster in Florida

T.J. Rives is a radio sportscaster in the Tampa Bay area. He is employed by Compass Media Networks, Fox Sports Radio, and the Tampa Bay Buccaneers Radio Network and has been with the Sirius XM Radio. He also owns and operates the company TAG Sports Group. He even hosts the SportsMediaWatch.com Podcast with Jon Lewis (Paulsen). Co-Hosts Big Fight Weekend Boxing podcast with journalist Dan Rafael.

== Biography ==
Rives is the sideline reporter for the Buccaneers Radio Network working with veteran Seminoles and Bucs play-by-play man, Gene Deckerhoff and color commentator Dave Moore and studio host Jack Harris. He is the play-by-play announcer for Tampa Bay Rays homes games on the Compass Media Networks with Rob Dibble, Steve Phillips, or Darryl Hamilton. He is a talk host for Fox Sports Radio as a host of Fox Sports Radio Saturday Night. He also called PGA Tour tournaments, World Baseball Classic tournaments in 2006, college football, and basketball for Sirius XM Radio. He was also the voice of the South Florida Bulls men's basketball for ten seasons. The Compass Media Networks hired Rives as their play-by-play announcer for Rays home games in 2013, the year after they hired, Steve Quis and Chris Carrino for their coverage of Los Angeles Angels of Anaheim games. Rives is a resident of Tampa.
