= Mike Thomas (wide receiver, born 1994) =

American football player (born 1994)

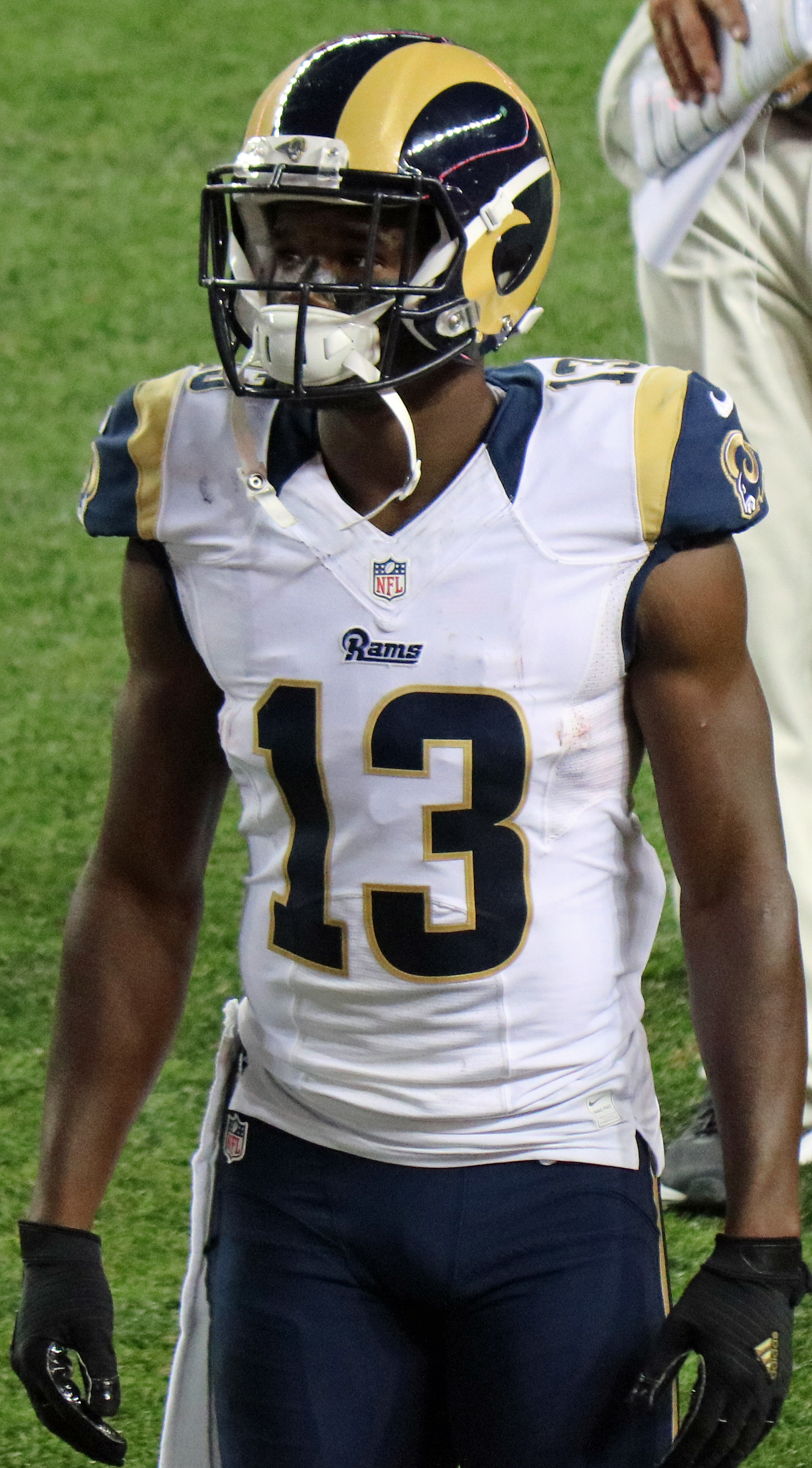
- Thomas with the Los Angeles Rams in 2016

No. 13, 88, 80
- Position: Wide receiver

Personal information
- Born: August 16, 1994 (age 32); Chicago, Illinois, U.S.
- Listed height: 6 ft 1 in (1.85 m)
- Listed weight: 189 lb (86 kg)

Career information
- High school: DuSable (Chicago)
- College: DuPage (2012); Dodge City CC (2013); Southern Miss (2014–2015)
- NFL draft: 2016: 6th round, 206th overall pick

Career history
- Los Angeles Rams (2016–2019); Cincinnati Bengals (2020–2022); Baltimore Ravens (2022)*
- * Offseason or practice squad member only

Awards and highlights
- All-Conference USA (2014)

Career NFL statistics
- Receptions: 30
- Receiving yards: 366
- Receiving touchdowns: 1
- Stats at Pro Football Reference

Michael Davonta Thomas (born August 16, 1994) is an American former professional football player who was a wide receiver in the National Football League (NFL). He played college football for the Southern Miss Golden Eagles and was selected by the Los Angeles Rams in the sixth round of the 2016 NFL draft.

== Early life ==
Thomas attended DuSable High School in Chicago, Illinois, where he led the Panthers football team to the state playoffs in 2010.

== College career ==
Thomas started his collegiate career at College of DuPage in Glen Ellyn, Illinois in 2012, he transferred to Dodge City Community College in Kansas in 2013. He signed with the University of Southern Mississippi after the season. Thomas played at Southern Mississippi from 2014 to 2016.

== Professional career ==
Pre-draft measurables
Height	Weight	Arm length	Hand span	Wingspan	40-yard dash	10-yard split	20-yard split	20-yard shuttle	Three-cone drill	Vertical jump	Broad jump	Bench press
6 ft 1 1/4 in (1.86 m)	193 lb (88 kg)	31 3/8 in (0.80 m)	9 3/8 in (0.24 m)	6 ft 3 1/2 in (1.92 m)	4.54 s	1.59 s	2.62 s	4.26 s	7.06 s	36 in (0.91 m)	10 ft 6 in (3.20 m)	16 reps
All values from Pro Day

=== Los Angeles Rams ===
The Los Angeles Rams selected Thomas in the sixth round with the 206th overall pick in the 2016 NFL draft. He was the 25th wide receiver selected. On June 9, 2016, the Rams signed Thomas to a four-year contract along with other Rams rookies. He finished his rookie season with just three receptions for 37 yards.

On July 14, 2017, Thomas was suspended the first four games of 2017 for violating the league's policy on performance-enhancing drugs.

On September 17, 2018, Thomas was placed on injured reserve after suffering a groin injury in Week 1. Without Thomas, the Rams reached Super Bowl LIII where they lost 13–3 to the New England Patriots.

=== Cincinnati Bengals ===
On March 24, 2020, Thomas signed with the Cincinnati Bengals. In Week 2 of the 2020 season, Thomas caught his first professional touchdown on a four-yard pass from Joe Burrow in the 35–30 loss to the Cleveland Browns.

On March 26, 2021, Thomas re-signed with the Bengals on a one-year contract. Thomas was a key special teams player for the Bengals, often serving as a gunner on kickoffs and punt returns. He was named a starter for the Week 4 game against the Jacksonville Jaguars, netting one total reception. He caught a 17-yard pass in the third quarter of Super Bowl LVI.

Thomas re-signed with the Bengals on a one-year contract on March 18, 2022. He was released during final roster cuts on August 30. He was quickly re–signed by the Bengals on September 1. Thomas would retain his role as a gunner and key special teams player for the team. He would start his first game of the season against the New Orleans Saints, filling in for an injured Tee Higgins, though he would not get any targets or receptions. Thomas would again be named a starter in Week 8 against the Browns, this time instead of the injured Ja'Marr Chase, he was targeted once in the game but failed to make the reception. Thomas was waived by the Bengals on November 21, 2022.

=== Baltimore Ravens ===
On December 20, 2022, Thomas signed with the practice squad of the Baltimore Ravens. He signed a reserve/future contract on January 16, 2023. On May 24, Thomas suffered a separated shoulder during organized team activities. Head coach John Harbaugh said that Thomas would require labrum surgery to repair the injury. He was released on July 25, 2023.
