= 2015 Charlotte 49ers football team =

American college football season

2015 Charlotte 49ers football
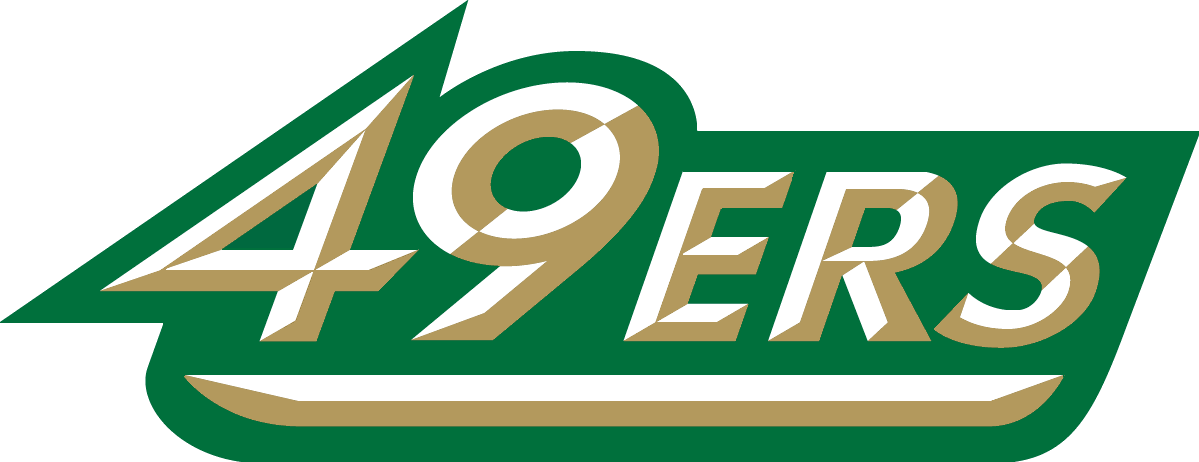
- Conference: Conference USA
- East Division
- Record: 2–10 (0–8 C-USA)
- Head coach: Brad Lambert (3rd season)
- Offensive coordinator: Jeff Mullen (3rd season)
- Offensive scheme: Spread
- Defensive coordinator: Matt Wallerstedt (1st season)
- Base defense: 3–4
- Home stadium: Jerry Richardson Stadium

2015 Conference USA football standings
	Conf.			Overall
Team	W		L	W		L
East Division
No. 24 Western Kentucky x$	8	–	0	12	–	2
Middle Tennessee	6	–	2	7	–	6
Marshall	6	–	2	10	–	3
FIU	3	–	5	5	–	7
Old Dominion	3	–	5	5	–	7
Florida Atlantic	3	–	5	3	–	9
Charlotte*	0	–	8	2	–	10
West Division
Southern Miss x	7	–	1	9	–	5
Louisiana Tech	6	–	2	9	–	4
UTSA	3	–	5	3	–	9
UTEP	3	–	5	5	–	7
Rice	3	–	5	5	–	7
North Texas	1	–	7	1	–	11
Championship: Western Kentucky 45, Southern Miss 28
$ – Conference champion; x – Division champion/co-champions; * Ineligible for postseason bowl due to transition from FCS; As of January 12, 2015; Rankings from AP Poll

The 2015 Charlotte 49ers football team represented the University of North Carolina at Charlotte (also called Charlotte or UNC Charlotte) in the 2015 NCAA Division I FBS football season. It was the school's third overall season of NCAA football, their first season of NCAA Division I Football Bowl Subdivision (FBS) play, and their first season as a member of Conference USA for football. The team was led by third-year head coach Brad Lambert and played its home games on campus at Jerry Richardson Stadium in Charlotte, North Carolina. As part of their transition to FBS they were ineligible to participate in the College Football Playoff and bowl games, but could have qualified for the Conference USA Football Championship Game. They finished the season 2–10, 0–8 in C-USA play to finish in last place in the East Division.

== Personnel ==
=== Coaching staff ===
Matt Wallerstedt joined the staff as defensive coordinator in January, replacing Bruce Tall, who left to become West Virginia's Defensive Line Coach. Phil Ratliff, offensive line coach and recruiting coordinator for the team's first two seasons, died unexpectedly before the season started on August 8, 2015. Former Carolina Panther, Kevin Donnalley, who had been part of the conditioning staff and radio broadcast team, took over Offensive Line coaching duties.

Name	Position	Seasons at Charlotte	Alma mater
Brad Lambert	Head coach	3	Kansas State (1987)
Jeff Mullen	Offensive coordinator	3	Wittenberg (1990)
Matt Wallerstedt	Defensive coordinator	1	Kansas State (1988)
James Adams	Secondary	3	Wake Forest (2006)
Aaron Curry	Defensive line	2	Wake Forest (2008)
Kevin Donnalley	Offensive line	1	North Carolina (1991)
Damien Gary	Running backs	3	Georgia (2005)
Johnson Richardson	Tight ends	3	Wofford (2010)
Napoleon Sykes	Outside linebackers	3	Wake Forest (2006)
Joe Tereshinski III	Wide receivers	3	Georgia (2006)

== Recruiting ==
=== Recruiting class ===
The following recruits and transfers have signed letters of intent to the Charlotte 49ers football program for the 2015 recruiting year.

College recruiting (2015)
Name	Hometown	School	Height	Weight	40^{‡}	Commit date
Alex Barrow; WR	Charlotte, NC	Butler	5 ft 11 in (1.80 m)	169 lb (77 kg)	–	Mar 31, 2014
Alex Barrow; WR	Recruit ratings: Scout: Rivals:					
Cameron Clark; OL	Greensboro, NC	Ben L. Smith	6 ft 4 in (1.93 m)	255 lb (116 kg)	–	Jun 18, 2014
Cameron Clark; OL	Recruit ratings: Scout: Rivals: ESPN:					
A.D. Cunningham; LB	Charleston, WV	South	6 ft 1 in (1.85 m)	210 lb (95 kg)	–	Apr 30, 2014
A.D. Cunningham; LB	Recruit ratings: Scout: Rivals:					
Darren Drake; OL	Locust Grove, GA	Luella	6 ft 3 in (1.91 m)	300 lb (140 kg)	–	Jul 8, 2014
Darren Drake; OL	Recruit ratings: Scout: Rivals: ESPN:					
Desmond Floyd; DL	Union, SC	Union	6 ft 5 in (1.96 m)	250 lb (110 kg)	4.90	Feb 4, 2015
Desmond Floyd; DL	Recruit ratings: Scout: Rivals: ESPN:					
Jeff Gemmell; H-Back	Wake Forest, NC	Heritage	6 ft 3 in (1.91 m)	215 lb (98 kg)	–	Jul 1, 2014
Jeff Gemmell; H-Back	Recruit ratings: Scout: Rivals:					
Jonathan Hardy; DE	Wilmington, NC	New Hanover	6 ft 4 in (1.93 m)	257 lb (117 kg)	–	Jun 3, 2014
Jonathan Hardy; DE	Recruit ratings: Scout: Rivals:					
Tyriq Harris; LB	Roanoke, VA	Hidden Valley	6 ft 3 in (1.91 m)	200 lb (91 kg)	–	Jun 13, 2014
Tyriq Harris; LB	Recruit ratings: Scout: Rivals:					
Michael Holmes; TE	Charlotte, NC	Victory Christian Center School	6 ft 3 in (1.91 m)	229 lb (104 kg)	4.63	Jan 26, 2015
Michael Holmes; TE	Recruit ratings: Scout: Rivals: ESPN:					
Darius Irvin; S	Winter Garden, FL	Heritage Academy	6 ft 0 in (1.83 m)	184 lb (83 kg)	–	Jun 29, 2014
Darius Irvin; S	Recruit ratings: Scout: Rivals:					
Ben Jacques; H-back	Mount Pleasant, SC	Wando	6 ft 6 in (1.98 m)	210 lb (95 kg)	–	Jul 16, 2014
Ben Jacques; H-back	Recruit ratings: Scout: Rivals:					
Nafees Lyon; DB	Charlotte, NC	Mallard Creek	5 ft 10 in (1.78 m)	179 lb (81 kg)	4.54	Jun 27, 2014
Nafees Lyon; DB	Recruit ratings: Scout: Rivals: ESPN:					
A.J. McDonald; S	Bamberg, SC	Bamberg-Earhardt	6 ft 0 in (1.83 m)	185 lb (84 kg)	–	Jun 26, 2014
A.J. McDonald; S	Recruit ratings: Scout: Rivals:					
Nate Mullen; WR	Charlotte, NC	Hickory Ridge	5 ft 8 in (1.73 m)	170 lb (77 kg)	4.5	Jun 20, 2014
Nate Mullen; WR	Recruit ratings: Scout: Rivals: ESPN:					
Trevor Stacy; OL	Huntington, WV	Spring Valley	6 ft 5 in (1.96 m)	290 lb (130 kg)	–	May 27, 2014
Trevor Stacy; OL	Recruit ratings: Scout: Rivals: ESPN:					
Randy Suydam; DE	Charlotte, NC	Mallard Creek	6 ft 3 in (1.91 m)	237 lb (108 kg)	–	Jun 28, 2014
Randy Suydam; DE	Recruit ratings: Scout: Rivals:					
Overall recruit ranking:
Note: In many cases, Scout, Rivals, 247Sports, On3, and ESPN may conflict in their listings of height and weight.; In these cases, the average was taken. ESPN grades are on a 100-point scale.; Sources: "Charlotte Football Commitments". Rivals.; "2015 Charlotte Football Commits". Scout.; "Class of 2015 Team Football Recruiting Rankings". ESPN.; "Scout.com Team Recruiting Rankings". Scout.; "2015 Team Ranking". Rivals.com.

== Players ==
=== Player gameday honors ===
Wearing Jersey #49	Position	Game	Game Captains	Flag Carriers
Jamal Covington	OT	Georgia State	Danny Book, Trent Bostick, Caleb Clayton-Molby, Branden Dozier	TL Ford II, Nick Cook, Anthony Covington
Danny Book∞	OT	Presbyterian	Richard Murphy, Kalif Phillips, Branden Dozier, James Middleton	Austin Duke, Terrance Winchester, Blake Brewer
Jarred Barr	G	Middle Tennessee	Danny Book, Andrew Buie, Nick Cook, Devon Johnson	Matt Johnson, Devin Pearson, Arthur Hart
Eugene German	OT	Florida Atlantic	Kalif Phillips, Jarred Barr, Nick Cook, Branden Dozier	Richard Murphy, Larry Ogunjobi, Anthony Covington
Zach Duncan	LB	Temple	Richard Murphy, Kalif Phillips, Caleb Clayton-Molby, Larry Ogunjobi	Jarred Barr, Terrance Winchester, Keaston Sinicki
Tanner Fleming	DL	Old Dominion	Nick Cook, Brandon Banks, Jamal Covington, Trent Bostick	Richard Murphy, Tank Norman, Anthony Covington
Richard Murphy	H-back	Southern Miss	Kalif Phillips; Danny Book, Branden Dozier, Brandon Banks	Casey Perry; Larry Ogunjobi, Keaston Sinicki
Dylan Ratliff†	–	Marshall	Larry Ogunjobi, Brandon Banks, Jarred Barr, Jamal Covington	Richard Hudson°
Nate Davis	OL	Florida International	Jamal Covington, Danny Book, Daquan Lucas, Larry Ogunjobi	Kyle Hoffman, Karrington King, Keaston Sinicki
Kalif Phillips	RB	UT San Antonio	Branden Dozier, Caleb Clayton-Molby, Danny Book, Richard Murphy	Austin Duke, Brandon Banks, Anthony Covington
Thomas La Bianca	C	Kentucky	Danny Book, Andrew Buie, Brandon Banks, Larry Ogunjobi	Richard Murphy, Caleb Clayton-Molby, R. J. Tyler
Danny Book∞	OT	Rice	Austin Duke, Andrew Buie, Daquan Lucas, Caleb Clayton-Molby	Casey Perry, Karrington King, Ardy Holmes

- †--Son of late Charlotte Offensive Line Coach and former Marshall football standout Phil Ratliff.
- °--U.S. Representative for North Carolina's 8th congressional district and UNC Charlotte Alumnus.
- ∞--Danny Book became the first 49er to wear the #49 jersey twice in one season. Book would finish his collegiate career having started all 34 games in program history.

=== Team ===
2015 Charlotte 49ers football team roster
Players
Coaches
Offense

Pos.	#	Name	Class
WR	2	Will Thomas	RJr
RB	3	Kalif Phillips	Jr
WR	4	Corey Nesmith Jr.	RJr
QB	5	Lee McNeill	RJr
WR	6	Workpeh Kofa	RFr
RB	7	Andrew Buie	RSr
QB	8	Matt Johnson	RJr
WR	9	Uriah LeMay	RSo
SR	10	Austin Duke	RJr
WR	11	Emmitt Afam	RSo
QB	12	Brooks Barden	RFr
WR	13	T.L. Ford II	So
WR	14	Mark Quattlebaum	RFr
H-Back	15	Justin Bolus	RJr
QB	16	Hasaan Klugh	RFr
WR	17	Alex Barrow	Fr
SR	18	Chris Montgomery	So
RB	22	Donjore Gainey	RJr
RB	29	Akease Rankin	Fr
RB	33	Garrison Duncan	RSo
H-Back	47	Kyle Hoffman	RJr
G	50	Jarred Barr	RJr
OL	51	Chris Brown	RFr
C	55	Mason Sledge	RJr
OL	60	Darren Drake	Fr
OL	61	Zach Thomas	RSr
OL	63	Cameron Curlings	RJr
OL	64	Nate Davis	RFr
OL	66	Joe Wolljung	RJr
OL	68	Daniel Book	RSr
OT	70	Casey Perry	RJr
OL	71	Cameron Clark	Fr
G	72	Tevin Lawshe	RSo
OT	73	Jamal Covington	RJr
G	74	Thomas LaBianca	RJr
OT	75	Eugene German	RSo
OT	77	Wolfgang Zacherl	RSo
OL	78	Trevor Stacy	Fr
H-Back	80	Ben Jacques	Fr
WR	81	Trent Bostick	Jr
H-Back	82	Jason Eury	RJr
WR	83	Nate Mullen	Fr
WR	84	Juwan Foggie	So
H-Back	85	Richard Murphy	Sr
H-Back	87	Zach Bumgardner	RJr
H-Back	88	R.J. Tyler	RFr
WR	89	Daniel Rose	Fr

Defense

Pos.	#	Name	Class
DB	3	Branden Dozier	Sr
LB	6	Nick Cook	RJr
LB	7	Jalen Holt	RJr
CB	8	Ardy Holmes	RSr
DB	9	Nafees Lyon	Fr
LB	11	Desmond Floyd	RSr
DB	14	Tank Norman	RJr
RB	16	Bradan Smith	So
LB	17	E.J. Rhinehart	RJr
CB	19	Devin Pearson	RSo
DB	20	Najee Tucker	RFr
FS	21	Prince Mayela	RJr
DB	22	Alex Duncan	So
DB	23	Anthony Covington	RSo
LB	24	Daquan Lucas	RSo
DB	25	Denzel Irvin	RFr
CB	26	Cortezz Nixon	RSr
CB	27	Terrance Winchester	RJr
DB	28	Greg Cunningham Jr.	RJr
LB	30	Darius Irvin	Fr
DB	31	Markevis Davis	So
LB	34	Jeff Gemmell	Fr
LB	35	Tyriq Harris	Fr
LB	35	Nick Vagnone	RFr
SS	36	Nick Halmon	RSo
DB	37	Jarel Crawford	Fr
DB	38	Connor Dulmage	RFr
DB	39	Tre'Shun Wynn	RFr
DB	41	A.J. McDonald	Fr
LB	42	Caleb Clayton-Mobly	RSr
DL	43	Weston Smith	RJr
LB	44	Cam Darley	So
LB	45	Christian Asher	RFr
LB	46	DaQuavius Reid	RJr
LB	50	Karrington King	RSo
LB	52	Zach Duncan	RFr
LB	53	Eric Herkley	RJr
LB	54	Jordan Starnes	RSo
DL	56	Randy Suydam	Fr
LB	57	Justin Bridges-Thompson	Jr
LB	58	A.D. Cunningham	Fr
LB	59	Stedman Lucas	RFr
DE	62	Tyler Fain	RFr
NT	65	Larry Ogunjobi	RJr
DL	67	Mitch Monska	RSo
DE	89	Devon Johnson	RSr
DE	90	Tommy Doctor	Fr
DE	91	Nick Carroll	RSo
DE	92	James Middleton	RJr
DL	93	Michael Holmes	Fr
DE	94	Josh Manley	RJr
DE	95	Devin Clegg	RJr
NT	97	Tanner Flemming	RJr
DL	98	Jon Hardy	Fr
DE	99	Brandon Banks	RJr

Special teams

Pos.	#	Name	Class
K	37	Hayden Pezzoni	RJr
LS	39	Brian McDonough	RFr
P	40	Arthur Hart	So
LS	48	Keaston Sinicki	Jr
K	69	Stephen Muscarello	RJr
K	86	Blake Brewer	Jr

Head coach

- Brad Lambert (Kansas State)
  Special teams

Coordinators/assistant coaches

- Jeff Mullen (Wittenberg)
  Offensive coordinator/quarterbacks
- Matt Wallerstedt (Kansas State)
  Defensive coordinator
- Kevin Donnalley (North Carolina)
  Offensive line
- Damien Gary (Georgia)
  Running backs
- Johnson Richardson (Wofford)
  Tight ends
- Joe Tereshinski III (Georgia)
  Wide receivers
- James Adams (Wake Forest)
  Secondary
- Napoleon Sykes (Wake Forest)
  Outside linebackers
- Aaron Curry (Wake Forest)
  Defensive line

Legend

- (C) Team captain
- (S) Suspended
- (I) Ineligible
- Injured
- Redshirt

Roster
Last update: April 12, 2015

=== Awards and honors ===
Conference USA Weekly Awards
Player	Award	Date Awarded	Ref.
Blake Brewer	Special teams player of the week	September 7, 2015	

Individual Awards
Player	Award	Ref.
Lee McNeill	Conference USA Football Scholar-Athlete of the Year	
Lee McNeill	Conference USA All-Academic Team	

All-Conference USA Team
Player	Selection	Ref.
Kalif Phillips	Second Team (Offense)	
Larry Ogunjobi	Second Team (Defense)	

=== Depth chart ===
Defense

FS
BRANDEN DOZIER
Najee Tucker
⋅

WLB	ILB	ILB	SLB
DAQUAN LUCAS	CALEB CLAYTON-MOBLY	NICK COOK	DESMOND FLOYD
Zeph Grimes	Jordan Starnes	Karrington King	Jalen Holt
⋅	⋅	⋅	⋅

SS
DEVIN PEARSON
Markevis Davis
Prince Mayela

CB
TERRANCE WINCHESTER
Greg Cunningham Jr.
⋅

DE	NT	DE
BRANDON BANKS	LARRY OGUNJOBI	DEVON JOHNSON
Nick Carroll	Tanner Fleming	James Middleton
Zach Duncan	⋅	⋅

CB
TANK NORMAN
Anthony Covington
⋅

Offense

WR
TRENT BOSTICK
Uriah LeMay
⋅

WR
RICHARD MURPHY
Justin Bolus
⋅

LT	LG	C	RG	RT
JAMAL COVINGTON	CASEY PERRY	THOMAS LA BIANCA	WOLFGANG ZACHERL	DANNY BOOK
Chris Brown	Mason Sledge	Jarred Barr	Nate Davis	Eugene German
⋅	⋅	⋅	⋅	⋅

WR
AUSTIN DUKE
Chris Montgomery
⋅

WR
T.L. FORD II
Workpeh Kofa
⋅

QB
LEE MCNEILL
Brooks Barden
Matt Johnson

RB
KALIF PHILLIPS
Andrew Buie
⋅

Special teams
PK Blake Brewer
PK Stephen Muscarello
P Arthur Hart
P Hayden Pezzoni
KR Mark Quattlebaum
PR Corey Nesmith
LS Keaston Sinicki
H Lee McNeill

== Schedule ==
Date	Time	Opponent	Site	TV	Result	Attendance
September 4	3:30 pm	at Georgia State*	Georgia Dome; Atlanta, GA	ESPNU	W 23–20	10,252
September 12	12:00 pm	Presbyterian*	Jerry Richardson Stadium; Charlotte, NC	ASN/ESPN3	W 34–10	16,631^{A}
September 19	7:00 pm	at Middle Tennessee	Johnny "Red" Floyd Stadium; Murfreesboro, TN		L 14–73	16,030
September 26	7:00 pm	Florida Atlantic	Jerry Richardson Stadium; Charlotte, NC	ASN	L 7–17	17,444^{A}
October 2	7:00 pm	Temple*	Jerry Richardson Stadium; Charlotte, NC	CBSSN	L 3–37	13,105
October 17	3:30 pm	at Old Dominion	Foreman Field; Norfolk, VA	ASN	L 34–37	20,118
October 24	12:00 pm	Southern Miss^{†}	Jerry Richardson Stadium; Charlotte, NC	ASN	L 10–44	13,813
October 31	3:30 pm	Marshall	Jerry Richardson Stadium; Charlotte, NC	FSN	L 10–34	15,381
November 7	12:00 pm	at FIU	FIU Stadium; Miami, FL	ASN	L 31–48	14,200
November 14	2:00 pm	UTSA	Jerry Richardson Stadium; Charlotte, NC	FCS	L 27–30 ^{OT}	11,331
November 21	7:30 pm	at Kentucky*	Commonwealth Stadium; Lexington, KY	SEC Alt.	L 10–58	56,195
November 28	3:30 pm	at Rice	Rice Stadium; Houston, TX	ASN	L 7–27	16,539
*Non-conference game; ^{†}Homecoming; All times are in Eastern time

- ^ADenotes the then largest crowd in Jerry Richardson Stadium history.

== Television ==
Local TV coverage continued with WCCB picking up all 6 of ASN's Charlotte 49ers broadcasts.

== Radio ==
Radio coverage for all games was broadcast by IMG College through the Charlotte 49ers Radio Network flagship station WFNZ 610 am The Fan. The radio announcers were Matt Swierad with play-by-play, former Carolina Panther Damione Lewis with color commentary, and Bobby Rosinski with sideline reports.

== Preseason media poll ==
Conference USA released their preseason media poll on July 16, 2015, with the 49ers predicted to finish in last place in the East Division.

East Division
Predicted finish	Team
1	Western Kentucky
2	Marshall
3	Middle Tennessee
4	Florida Atlantic
5	FIU
6	Old Dominion
7	Charlotte

== Game summaries ==
=== Georgia State Panthers ===
Georgia State vs. Charlotte

Team	1	2	3	4	Total
• 49ers	13	7	3	0	23
Panthers	0	3	3	14	20

- Date: September 4
- Location: Georgia Dome
  Atlanta, GA
- Game start: 3:32 pm EDT
- Elapsed time: 3:33
- Game attendance: 10,252
- Game weather: Indoor Stadium
- Referee: Jeff Hilyer
- TV announcers (ESPNU): Jason Benetti, Charles Arbuckle

Scoring summary
1	13:28	CHAR	Terrance WINCHESTER 43 yd. fumble recovery (Blake BREWER kick)	CHAR 7–0
1	8:58	CHAR	Blake BREWER 45 yd. field goal	CHAR 10–0
1	1:53	CHAR	Blake BREWER 35 yd. field goal	CHAR 13–0
2	4:07	GAST	Wil Lutz 29 yd. field goal	CHAR 13–3
2	2:40	CHAR	Austin DUKE 63 yd pass from Matt JOHNSON (Blake BREWER kick)	CHAR 20–3
3	12:07	GAST	Wil LUTZ 50 yd. field goal	CHAR 20–6
3	7:32	CHAR	Blake BREWER 22 yd. field goal	CHAR 23–6
4	9:39	GAST	Taz BATEMAN 24 yd. pass from Nick Arbuckle (Wil LUTZ kick)	CHAR 23–13
4	0:30	GAST	Penny Hart 53 yd. pass from Nick ARBUCKLE (Wil LUTZ kick)	CHAR 23–20

The 49ers accomplished several firsts with their 2015 opener. It was their first game as an FBS team, their first game against an FBS opponent, and their first game in an NFL stadium. It was also their first FBS level win.

On the opening drive for Georgia St. Nick Arbuckle completed a 4-yard pass to Glenn Smith, but Charlotte's Nick Cook forced him to fumble, which was recovered by the 49ers' Terrance Winchester and returned to the endzone for Charlotte's first points as an FBS program. On Charlotte's first official offense of the game, Blake Brewer capped the drive with a 45-yard field goal. Charlotte capped a 14 play drive late in the quarter on a Blake Brewer 35-yard field goal. The score moving into the second quarter was Charlotte 13, Georgia State 0.

Charlotte's first drive of the second quarter ended a 14-play drive on a Matt Johnson interception by the Panthers' Bobby Baker near the endzone. Midway through the quarter Georgia State got their first points off a Wil Lutz 29-yard field goal. On the next drive the 49ers stretched their lead on a Matt Johnson 63-yard pass to Austin Duke. The teams headed to the locker rooms with the score 49ers 20, Panthers 3.

The second half saw the Panthers tack on another Wil Lutz field goal from 50 yards out to cap their first possession. On the next possession Charlotte ended a 15-play drive off Blake Brewer's third successful field goal of the day, this time from 22 yards out. The third quarter ended with the 49ers on top 23 to 6.

The final quarter of action saw the Panthers end their first drive when Wil Lutz's 44-yard field goal attempt bounced off the crossbar. On their next drive the Panthers found the endzone for the first time on a Nick Arbuckle 24-yard pass to Taz Bateman. The teams swapped the ball for the rest of the quarter until the 30-second mark, when Nick Arbuckle found Penny Hart for a 53-yard touchdown to get within 3 points of tying the game. With no timeouts left, the Panthers made an on-side kick attempt but the ball rolled out of bounds. The Charlotte 49ers held on to win their first FBS game by the score of 23 to 20.

Coach Lambert presented the game ball to late offensive line coach Phil Ratliff's daughter Haley on the sidelines.

Top performers for the game were Georgia State quarterback Nick Arbuckle, who passed for 299 yards, 2 touchdowns and 1 interception. Charlotte rusher Kaliff Phillips had 19 carries for 90 yards. Charlotte's Austin Duke had 7 receptions for 95 yards and a touchdown.

Game notes:

- First FBS game, and first FBS win.
- First game in an NFL venue, and first indoor game.
- First game in program history in the State of Georgia.
- Charlotte kicker Blake Brewer was named C-USA special teams player of the week.

=== Presbyterian Blue Hose ===
Presbyterian vs. Charlotte

Team	1	2	3	4	Total
Blue Hose	0	0	0	10	10
• 49ers	7	17	10	0	34

- Date: September 12
- Location: Jerry Richardson Stadium
  Charlotte, NC
- Game start: 12:06 pm EDT
- Elapsed time: 3:15
- Game attendance: 16,631
- Game weather: 76 °F (24 °C), Cloudy, 6 mph (9.7 km/h)
- Referee: Javarro Edwards
- TV announcers (ASN, WCCB): Mike Gleason, Jim Donnan

Scoring summary
1	0:42	CHAR	Trent BOSTICK 6 yd pass from Matt JOHNSON (Blake BREWER kick)	CHAR 7–0
2	6:54	CHAR	Blake BREWER 24 yd field goal	CHAR 10–0
2	4:51	CHAR	Kalif PHILLIPS 12 yd run (Blake BREWER kick)	CHAR 17–0
2	3:23	CHAR	DUKE, Austin 39 yd pass from JOHNSON, Matt (BREWER, Blake kick)	CHAR 24–0
3	10:32	CHAR	Blake BREWER 35 yd field goal	CHAR 27–0
3	1:52	CHAR	Bradan SMITH 9 yd pass from Brooks BARDEN (Blake BREWER kick)	CHAR 34–0
4	11:17	PRES	Brett NORTON 21 yd field goal	CHAR 34–3
4	4:36	PRES	Darrell BRIDGES 1 yd run (Brett NORTON kick)	CHAR 34–10

The Blue Hose were looking to spoil the 49ers' home opener as an FBS level program, but Charlotte got their second victory of the year behind a superlative defensive effort.

Neither team made much headway scoring in the first quarter with Blake Brewer missing his first field goal of the season from 37 yards out with two minutes left in the quarter. On their next possession, after an interception, the 49ers found the endzone on a Matt Johnson 6-yard pass to Trent Bostick. The score at the end of the quarter was 49ers up 7 to 0.

The second quarter also started slowly for both teams, but midway through the quarter Blake Brewer split the uprights from 24 yards out to cap a 13-play drive. On Charlotte's next possession Kalif Phillips punched it into the endzone from 12 yards out. On the first play of their next drive Matt Johnson found Austin Duke for a 39-yard touchdown pass. The half ended with Charlotte up 24 to 0, holding the Blue Hose to 11 total offensive yards for the half.

On the 49ers first possession of the second half, Blake Brewer made a 35-yard field goal. Later in the half Brooks Barden connected for a 9-yard pass to Bradan Smith for both players' first points as 49ers. The third quarter ended with Charlotte up 34 to 0.

On a 13-play drive that started in the third quarter and finished in the fourth, the Blue Hose got their first points of the day off a Brett Norton 21-yard field goal. On Presbyterian's next drive, Darrell Bridges pushed it in from the 1-yard line to get the Blue Hose their only touchdown of the day. Charlotte kept the ball for the last 4 minutes of the game and win 34 to 10.

Top performers for the game were Charlotte quarterback Matt Johnson, who passed for 187 yards and 2 touchdowns. Presbyterian rusher Darrell Bridges had 22 carries for 62 yards and a touchdown. Charlotte's Austin Duke had 9 receptions for 166 yards and a touchdown.

Game notes:

- Presbyterian played CCUNC during the Owls' three years of existence in the late 1940s.
- Charlotte's defense set records for fewest yards allowed (112), fewest passing yards allowed (9) and most tackles for loss (19).

=== Middle Tennessee Blue Raiders ===
Middle Tennessee vs. Charlotte

Team	1	2	3	4	Total
49ers	7	7	0	0	14
• Blue Raiders	42	7	17	7	73

- Date: September 19
- Location: Johnny "Red" Floyd Stadium
  Murfreesboro, TN
- Game start: 6:00 pm CDT
- Elapsed time: 2:58
- Game attendance: 16,030
- Game weather: 85 °F (29 °C), Cloudy, 10 mph (16 km/h)
- Referee: Tra Blake

Scoring summary
1	11:52	MTSU	Terry PETTIS 76 yd pass from Brent STOCKSTILL (Cody CLARK kick)	MTSU 7–0
1	10:07	MTSU	Jordan PARKER 62 yd run (Cody CLARK kick)	MTSU 14–0
1	3:11	MTSU	Jordan PARKER 4 yd run (Cody CLARK kick)	MTSU 21–0
1	3:05	CHAR	Uriah LEMAY 48 yd kickoff return (Blake BREWER kick)	MTSU 21–7
1	2:54	MTSU	Terry PETTIS 75 yd pass from Brent STOCKSTILL (Cody CLARK kick)	MTSU 28–7
1	2:33	MTSU	Ed'Marques BATTIES 9 yd pass from Brent STOCKSTILL (Cody CLARK kick)	MTSU 35–7
1	0:00	MTSU	Ed'Marques BATTIES 35 yd pass from Brent STOCKSTILL (Cody CLARK kick)	MTSU 42–7
2	10:33	MTSU	Ed'Marques BATTIES 59 yd pass from Brent STOCKSTILL (Cody CLARK kick)	MTSU 49–7
2	6:35	CHAR	Kalif PHILLIPS 1 yd run (Blake BREWER kick)	MTSU 49–14
3	9:11	MTSU	Jordan PARKER 2 yd run (Cody CLARK kick)	MTSU 56–14
3	6:18	MTSU	Cody CLARK 31 yd field goal	MTSU 59–14
3	0:25	MTSU	Darius HARRIS 42 yd interception return (Cody CLARK kick)	MTSU 66–14
4	9:06	MTSU	Desmond ANDERSON 1 yd run (Cody CLARK kick)	MTSU 73–14

The 49ers entered their first C-USA football game on the road, hoping to surprise the Blue Raiders. Instead, the 49ers got a heavy dose of FBS level reality as Middle Tennessee put together a six touchdown first quarter performance and never looked back.

On Middle Tennessee's second play from scrimmage, Terry Pettis ran in a 76-yard touchdown from Brent Stockstill. On their next possession and only their fourth play from the line, the Blue Raiders' Jordan Parker ran it in from 62 yards out. Charlotte immediately put together a ten-play drive to get Blake Brewer into field goal range, but the 36-yard kick bounced off the left upright. The Blue Raiders added a team third and Jordan Parker's second touchdown on the next series from 4 yards out. The 49ers' Uriah LeMay returned the subsequent on-sides kick return 48 yards to get Charlotte its first touchdown of the game, only to have the Blue Raiders score another touchdown and Terry Pettis's second on the next play from the line, a 75-yard pass completion from Brent Stockstill. The 49ers' Brooks Barden threw an interception to the Raiders' Jeremy Carter on the very next play from scrimmage, only to have the 49ers' Kaliff Phillips force him to fumble; however, the Raiders' Jimal McBride recovered the fumble. On the next play, the Raiders got their fifth first-quarter touchdown when Ed'Marquse Batties caught a 9-yard pass from Stockstill on the very next play. Batties became the third Blue Raider to get a second touchdown in the first quarter after running in a 35-yard pass from Stockstill, capping an incredible six consecutive series that resulted in Middle Tennessee touchdowns. In what can only be described as the 49ers' worst quarter of football to date, Charlotte found itself down 42 to 7.

In the second quarter, Charlotte bracketed Middle Tennessee's first series with a pair of fumbles, but forced a 4 and out to break up Middle Tennessee's touchdown streak. After the second fumble, the Blue Raiders added their seventh touchdown of the game and Battie's third straight score on a 59-yard pass from Stockstill. After both teams fumbled the ball on their next series (Charlotte's third consecutive series to end in a fumble), the 49ers managed to string together a six-play drive, resulting in Kaliff Phillips punching in a 1-yard touchdown. At the end of the worst half of football in the programs' young history, the 49ers found themselves in a 35-point hole, down 49 to 14.

The second half brought no relief to the beleaguered 49ers, as the Blue Raiders used their first possession of the half to put together an eleven-play drive, capping it with Jordan Parker's third score of the day on a 2-yard run. Charlotte's Matt Johnson threw an interception on the 49ers' next possession that resulted in Middle Tennessee's next series ending with the only successful field goal of the game. The Blue Raiders' Cody Clark connected from 31 yards out. Johnson threw another interception later in the quarter that resulted in a return for a touchdown by the Blue Raiders' Darius Harris. The score at the end of the quarter was Middle Tennessee up 66 to 14.

The final points of the game were the only points scored in the final quarter of play. After Charlotte's Lee McNeill threw an interception, the Blue Raiders capped a seven-play drive on a Desmond Anderson 1-yard touchdown run. The game ended with the worst performance to date for the Charlotte 49ers. A 73 to 14 loss in their first conference game.

Top performances for the game were dominated by the Blue Raiders, starting with quarterback Brent Stockstill who passed for 369 yards and 5 touchdowns. Rusher Jordan Parker had 14 carries for 142 yards and 3 touchdowns. Terry Pettis had 4 receptions for an incredible 167 yards and 2 touchdowns.

Game notes:

- First C-USA game.
- First team flight in program history.
- First game in program history in the State of Tennessee.
- Middle Tennessee set records for points (73), touchdowns (10) and total offense (695 yds), and matched records with five passing touchdowns and 9 offensive touchdowns.
- First 49ers game in the Central Time Zone.

=== Florida Atlantic Owls ===
Florida Atlantic vs. Charlotte

Team	1	2	3	4	Total
• Owls	7	3	0	7	17
49ers	0	0	0	7	7

- Date: September 26
- Location: Jerry Richardson Stadium
  Charlotte, NC
- Game start: 7:05 pm EDT
- Elapsed time: 3:15
- Game attendance: 17,444
- Game weather: 66 °F (19 °C), Rain, 2 mph (3.2 km/h)
- Referee: Ken Antee
- TV announcers (ASN, WCCB): Mike Gleason, Jim Donnan

Scoring summary
1	3:38	FAU	Jaquez JOHNSON 14 yd run (Greg Joseph kick)	FAU 7–0
2	9:51	FAU	Greg JOSEPH 45 yd field goal	FAU 10–0
4	10:58	CHAR	Tank NORMAN 28 yd interception return, (Blake BREWER kick)	FAU 10–7
4	1:28	FAU	Ocie ROSE 60 yd interception return,(Greg JOSEPH kick)	FAU 17–7

The 49ers hosted their first FBS game and C-USA football opponents, the Florida Atlantic Owls.

The game got off to a slow start with Charlotte fumbling the ball on the opening drive and Florida Atlantic turning it over three drives later on an interception. Late in the quarter on their third drive of the game, the Owls scored on a Jaquez Johnson 14-yard quarterback keeper. The quarter ended with the Owls up 7 to 0.

On the first drive of the second quarter, Charlotte quarterback Lee McNeill threw an interception to Florida Atlantic's Jalen Young. Four plays later, the Owls' Greg Joseph connected on a 45-yard field goal to stretch the lead to 10 points. The Owls fumbled the ball again only to have Charlotte quarterback Matt Johnson throw an interception to return them the ball on the next series. At the end of the half on a misting night, both teams headed to the locker room with two sets of turnovers and the Owls having a 10 to 0 lead.

With the rain now coming down steady, the turnovers continued to mount for both teams as the 49ers' Lee McNeill tossed his second interception of the game on the second series of the half, only to have the Owls fumble for a third time three plays later. The two turnovers proved to be the highlights of a third quarter that saw neither team move the ball much and that ended with the same score as the previous quarter. Owls still held on to a 10 to 0 lead heading toward the fourth quarter.

Two plays in to their first drive of the quarter, the Owls' Jaquez Johnson threw an interception, and fourth turnover, to the 49ers' Tank Norman, who took it back 28 yards for Charlotte's first score of the game. Three plays later the Owls fumbled for their fifth turnover. Three drives later, Matt Johnson threw Charlotte's fourth interception pass of the game, which led to a 36-yard field goal attempt by Greg Joseph which sailed right. On the ensuing drive which took the game past the two-minute mark, the 49ers put together an eleven-play drive that got them deep into Owls' territory and with a chance to take the lead; but Lee McNeill threw his third, and the teams' fifth, interception of the game to the Owl's Ocie Rose, who returned it 60 yards for the final score of the game. Two plays later Ocie Rose again intercepted Lee McNeill's pass to help preserve the win for Florida Atlantic. The final score at the end of a rainy second half of football was Florida Atlantic 17, Charlotte 7.

Top performances for the game included FAU quarterback Jaquez Johnson who passed for 144 yards with two interceptions. Charlotte Rusher Kaliff Phillips had 29 carries for 165 yards. FAU's Jenson Stoshak had 5 receptions for 38.

Game notes:

- First C-USA home game.
- First home night game.
- Both teams combined for 12 turnovers. Charlotte had 7 and FAU 5.
- Charlotte Nose Tackle Larry Ogunjobi had 11 tackles including 4 for a loss.

=== Temple Owls ===
Temple vs. Charlotte

Team	1	2	3	4	Total
• Owls	3	7	20	7	37
49ers	0	3	0	0	3

- Date: October 2
- Location: Jerry Richardson Stadium
  Charlotte, NC
- Game start: 7:04 pm EDT
- Elapsed time: 3:10
- Game attendance: 13,105
- Game weather: 56 °F (13 °C), Rain, 3 mph (4.8 km/h) SE
- Referee: Joe Pester
- TV announcers (CBSSN): Ben Holden, Jay Feely, John Schriffen

Scoring summary
1	2:06	TEMP	Austin JONES 39 yd field goal	TEMP 3–0
2	6:12	TEMP	Jahad THOMAS 1 yd run (Austin JONES kick)	TEMP 10–0
2	3:36	CHAR	Blake BREWER 36 yd field goal	TEMP 10–3
3	9:42	TEMP	Jahad THOMAS 1 yd run (Austin JONES kick)	TEMP 17–3
3	5:52	TEMP	Robby Anderson 11 yd pass from P.J. WALKER(Austin JONES kick)	TEMP 24–3
3	3:22	TEMP	Nate L. SMITH 16 yd blocked punt return (Austin JONES kick blocked)	TEMP 30–3
4	8:10	TEMP	Robby ANDERSON 13 yd pass from P.J. WALKER (Austin JONES kick)	TEMP 37–3

The 49ers hosted their first non-conference FBS opponents and second of three "Owls" mascot schools they'd play this season; former A10 conference foes Temple, now in the AAC.

The game started off slow as gusting wind and driving rain from Hurricane Joaquin and a Nor'easter disrupted both teams from connecting on their first two field goal attempts. Temple scored the first points of the game late in the first quarter on an Austin Jones 39-yard field goal. The score at the end of the half was Owls 3, 49ers 0.

Charlotte's Blake Brewer missed a very long 71-yard field goal attempt on the third play of the second quarter. Late in the quarter the Owls strung together a thirteen-play drive and cap it with a Jahad Thomas 1-yard touchdown. On the next series the 49ers got into the Owls redzone but had to settle for a 56-yard Blake Brewer field goal after losing yards. The score at the half was Temple 10, Charlotte 3.

The first three 49ers' series of the second half completely put the game out of reach for Charlotte. After an opening drive three and out, the subsequent short punt return stayed on Charlotte's side of the field. This set Temple up for a nine-play drive that resulted in another Jahad Thomas 1-yard touchdown. On the next Charlotte drive, yet another three and out and another short punt yielded another Temple touchdown, this one an 11-yard pass from P.J. Walker to Robby Anderson. On the next 49ers' series Temple's Nate L. Smith blocked the punt and recover it for a 16-yard defensive touchdown. The 49ers blocked the subsequent point-after attempt. The score going into the final quarter of play was Temple up 30 to 3.

Charlotte's first drive of the fourth quarter got the 49ers deep into Temple's side of the field, but Lee McNeill's pass attempt was intercepted by Nate L. Smith and returned 74 yards, setting up a seven-play drive that resulted in the final points of the game, a Temple 13-yard passing touchdown from P.J. Walker to Robby Anderson. A late fumble for Temple proved insignificant and the game finished with Temple winning by the score of 37 to 3.

Top performances of the game included Temple Quarterback P.J. Walker, who threw for 116 yards and 2 touchdowns. Temple's Jahad Thomas had 20 carries for 109 yards and two touchdowns and also lead all receivers with 3 receptions for 48 yards.

Game notes:

- First non-conference FBS game.
- First home weekday game.

=== Old Dominion Monarchs ===
Old Dominion vs. Charlotte

Team	1	2	3	4	Total
49ers	14	10	0	10	34
• Monarchs	6	6	10	15	37

- Date: October 17
- Location: Foreman Field
  Norfolk, VA
- Game start: 3:30 pm EDT
- Elapsed time: 3:37
- Game attendance: 20,118
- Game weather: 66 °F (19 °C), Sunny, 8 mph (13 km/h) NNW
- Referee: Ken Antee
- TV announcers (ASN, WCCB): Mike Gleason, Ken Dunek, Monica McNutt

Scoring summary
1	11:20	CHAR	Kalif PHILLIPS 1 yd run (Blake BREWER kick)	CHAR 7–0
1	10:51	ODU	Zach PASCAL 53 yd pass from David WASHINGTON (Chris KIRTLEY kick blocked)	CHAR 7–6
1	4:54	CHAR	Andrew BUIE 1 yd run (Blake BREWER kick)	CHAR 14–6
2	14:20	CHAR	Blake BREWER 31 yd field goal	CHAR 17–6
2	11:13	ODU	Chris KIRTLEY 40 yd field goal	CHAR 17–9
2	10:24	ODU	Chris KIRTLEY 42 yd field goal	CHAR 17–12
2	3:30	CHAR	Kalif PHILLIPS 36 yd run (Blake BREWER kick)	CHAR 24–12
3	9:29	ODU	Marques LITTLE 33 yd pass from David WASHINGTON (Chris KIRTLEY kick)	CHAR 24–19
3	3:09	ODU	Chris KIRTLEY 45 yd field goal	CHAR 24–22
4	13:36	CHAR	Matt JOHNSON 1 yd run (Blake BREWER kick)	CHAR 31–22
4	9:46	ODU	Zach PASCAL 15 yd pass from David WASHINGTON (Chris KIRTLEY kick)	CHAR 31–29
4	5:11	CHAR	Blake BREWER 20 yd field goal	CHAR 34–29
4	2:18	ODU	Zach PASCAL 11 yd pass from David WASHINGTON (Jonathan DUHART pass from David WASHINGTON)	ODU 37–34

The Monarchs canceled a 2014 out of conference game with the 49ers to play an SEC program. The Niners responded by cancelling their 2013 match up to replace the home game lost in the 2014 season with another opponent. Former Sun Belt basketball foes would finally meet for the first time on the gridiron to renew an old rivalry in this game.

The Niners struck first on a Kaliff Phillips 1-yard touchdown run. The Monarchs would respond on the next series when Zach Pascal would catch a 53-yard touchdown pass from David Washington; however, the Niners' Jalen Holt would block the point after attempt to preserve the early lead. Later in the first quarter the Niners would put together a ten play drive that would be capped by an Andrew Buie 1-yard touchdown run. On ODU's final drive of the quarter they would get deep into Charlotte territory only to have Charlotte's Caleb Clayton-Mobly force Old Dominion's Ray Lawry to fumble the ball, which was recovered by the Niners' Zach Duncan. Charlotte would march back down the field to get into scoring range at the end of the quarter. The teams would switch sides with the Niners up 14 to 6.

In the second quarter a thirteen play drive which started on ODU's late first quarter fumble would result in a Blake Brewer 31-yard field goal. The Monarchs would respond on the next series with a 40-yard Chris Kirtley field goal. Two plays into their next series the Niners' Uriah Lemay would catch a Lee McNeill pass for 19 yards only to be held up from going down with only one foot on the ground, which eventually resulted in the Monarchs' Pat Toal forcing the fumble which was recovered for the Monarchs by T.L. Ricks. The resulting series would end on a Chris Kirtley 42-yard field goal. Later in the half Charlotte's Kalif Phillips would break away for a 36-yard touchdown run. The Monarchs' next series would end on a Terrence Winchester interception of a David Washington pass. The teams would head into the lock rooms with Charlotte leading 24 to 12.

On the first series of the second half Charlotte's Lee McNeill would be picked off by C.J. Bradshaw. Two series later David Washington would find Marquse Little with a 33-yard touchdown pass. On the next series the Niners would get Blake Brewer in field goal range only to have his 48-yard attempt blocked by Rashaad Coward and recovered by the Monarchs' Marvin Branch. A few plays later ODU's Chris Kirtley would connect on a 45-yard field goal. At the end of the third quarter Charlotte would have a slim 24 to 22 lead.

On the first drive of the final quarter Charlotte's Matt Johnson would punch it in for a 1-yard touchdown. On their first drive of the quarter ODU would get Chris Kirtley back into field goal range only to see his 35-yard attempt sail left of the left upright. On the Monarchs' next drive Zach Pascal would catch a 15-yard touchdown pass from David Washington for his second touchdown of the game to get the Monarchs' back within two points. Midway through the quarter the Niners would get Blake Brewer into rang for a successful 20-yard field goal to stretch the lead back out to five points. ODU would reply on the next series as Zach Pascal would catch an 11-yard touchdown pass from David Washington for his third of the day and giving ODU their first lead of the game. The Monarchs would go for two to prevent the Niners from winning the game on a field goal. David Washington's pass to Jonathan Duhart would succeed. Needing a field goal to tie the game, the Niners would get to ODU's 44-yard line, but the series would end on a four-and-out, allowing the Monarchs to preserve their come-from-behind Homecoming win by a score of 37 to 34.

Top performances of the game included ODU Quarterback David Washington, who threw for 365 yards, 4 touchdowns and 1 interception. Charlotte's Kalif Phillips had 35 carries for 20 yards and two touchdowns. ODU's Zach Pascal had 11 receptions for 231 yards and 3 touchdowns.

Game notes:

- Charlotte outgained ODU in total offense (536 yards to 482 yards). The 49ers have outgained five of their six opponents and two of their three C-USA foes.

=== Southern Mississippi Golden Eagles ===
Southern Mississippi vs. Charlotte

Team	1	2	3	4	Total
• Golden Eagles	10	13	14	7	44
49ers	3	0	7	0	10

- Date: October 24
- Location: Jerry Richardson Stadium
  Charlotte, NC
- Game start: 12:04 pm EDT
- Elapsed time: 3:11
- Game attendance: 13,813
- Game weather: 68 °F (20 °C), Partly Cloudy, 5 mph (8.0 km/h)
- Referee: Stephen LaManti
- TV announcers (ASN, WCCB): Mike Gleason, Jim Donnan

Scoring summary
1	7:19	CHAR	Blake BREWER 25 yd field goal	CHAR 3–0
1	5:49	USM	Michael THOMAS 69 yd pass from Nick Mullens (Steven BRAUCHLE kick)	USM 7–3
1	3:47	USM	Steven BRAUCHLE 38 yd field goal	USM 10–3
2	7:49	USM	Taylor MARINI 9 yd pass from Nick MULLENS(Steven BRAUCHLE kick failed)	USM 16–3
2	1:44	USM	Korey Robertson 4 yd pass from Nick MULLENS (Steven BRAUCHLE kick)	USM 23–3
3	8:29	USM	Casey MARTIN 4 yd pass from Nick MULLENS (Steven BRAUCHLE kick)	USM 30–3
3	5:54	CHAR	Lee MCNEILL 20 yd run (Blake BREWER kick)	USM 30–10
3	5:41	USM	Jalen RICHARD 95 yd kickoff return (Steven BRAUCHLE kick)	USM 37–10
4	13:56	USM	Jalen RICHARD 7 yd run (Steven BRAUCHLE kick)	USM 44–10

These renewed C-USA opponents met for the first time on the football field as the 49ers hosted the Golden Eagles for Homecoming.

Charlotte would score first on a Blake Brewer 25-yard field goal on Charlotte's second series of the game. Southern Miss would strike back quickly on the next drive with a Nick Mullens 69-yard touchdown pass to Michael Thomas. On their next drive the Golden Eagles would stretch their lead on a Steven Brauchle 38-yard field goal. Charlotte would get into field goal range before the end of the quarter, but Brewer's 49-yard attempt would fail. Heading to the second quarter Southern Miss would have a 10 to 3 lead.

Midway through the second quarter the Golden Eagles' Taylor Marini would catch a 9-yard touchdown pass from Mullens. The 49ers' next drive would end in a punt, but the Golden Eagles' Korey Robertson would fumble it away to the 49ers' Chris Montgomery deep in Southern Miss territory. On the very next play the Golden Eagles' Kalan Reed would intercept a Lee McNeill pass in the end zone for a touch back. The subsequent Golden Eagles' nine play drive ended in Nick Mullens' third touchdown pass of the half, a 4-yard pass to Korey Robertson. At the half Southern Miss held a 23 to 3 lead over Charlotte.

The Golden Eagle's first drive of the second half would eat up six and a half minutes on fourteen plays and culminate in Nick Mullen's fourth touchdown pass of the day, a 4-yard throw to Casey Martin. Charlotte would return the favor or the next drive off a Lee McNeill quarterback scramble from 20 yards out, resulting in Charlotte's only touchdown of the day. Any hope of a 49ers comeback died on the ensuing kick return as the Golden Eagles's Jalen Richard would return it 95 yards for a touchdown. Going into the final quarter the Golden Eagles had a commanding 37 to 10 lead.

Charlotte would switch to a passing attack to attempt to get back in the game, but on the 49ers' first series of the quarter Matt Johnson's pass would be intercepted by Darian Yancy and returned all the way to the Charlotte 2 yard line. Two plays later the Eagles' Jalen Richard would punch in a final touchdown from 7 yards back. On the first play from scrimmage on the 49ers' next series Lee McNeill would be intercepted by Cornell Armstrong. On Charlotte's next drive their punt return to the Golden Eagles' Jalen Richard would be fumbled and recovered by the 49ers' Eric Herkley. Despite being in the Golden Eagles' redzone the 49ers couldn't find the end zone and settled for a Blake Brewer field goal attempt that would miss from 42 yards out. The Golden Eagles would spoil Homecoming for the 49ers and take home a 44 to 10 win.

Top performances of the game were dominated by the Golden Eagles. Quarterback Nick Mullens threw for 265 yards and 4 touchdowns. Jalen Richard had 13 carries for 114 yards and a touchdown. Michael Thomas had 6 receptions for 105 yards and a touchdown.

Game notes:

- The Pride of Mississippi Marching Band became the first visiting band to perform at a Charlotte 49ers home football game.

=== Marshall Thundering Herd ===
Marshall vs. Charlotte

Team	1	2	3	4	Total
• Thundering Herd	14	17	0	3	34
49ers	0	3	0	7	10

- Date: October 31
- Location: Jerry Richardson Stadium
  Charlotte, NC
- Game start: 3:35 pm EDT
- Elapsed time: 3:16
- Game attendance: 15,381
- Game weather: 61 °F (16 °C), Partly Cloudy, 5 mph (8.0 km/h)
- Referee: Tra Blake
- TV announcers (Fox Sports): Mark Followill, Brian Baldinger, Lesley McCaslin

Scoring summary
1	12:05	MAR	Remi WATSON 7 yd run (Nick SMITH kick)	MAR 7–0
1	6:30	MAR	Davonte ALLEN 66 yd pass from Chase Litton (Nick SMITH kick)	MAR 14–0
2	13:27	MAR	Ryan YURACHEK 17 yd pass from Chase LITTON (Nick SMITH kick)	MAR 21–0
2	9:12	MAR	Keion DAVIS 6 yd run (Nick SMITH kick)	MAR 28–0
2	5:21	CHAR	Blake BREWER 34 yd field goal	MAR 28–3
2	0:59	MAR	Nick SMITH 32 yd field goal	MAR 31–3
4	13:01	MAR	Nick SMITH 39 yd field goal	MAR 34–3
4	6:29	CHAR	Kalif PHILLIPS 6 yd run (Blake BREWER kick)	MAR 34–10

On Halloween the defending C-USA Champions rolled into the Queen City for their first football meeting with the 49ers.

Pregame activities included a skydiving team from Skydive Carolina bringing in the game ball as well as a tribute to late 49ers Offensive Line coach and former Marshall Offensive Line standout Phil Ratliff. U.S. Congressman and UNC Charlotte alumnus Richard Hudson presented the late Coach Ratliff's wife Jenni and two children Haley and Dylan with a U.S. flag flown over the U.S. Capitol in Coach Ratliff memory.

Marshall would score first on their first drive with a Remi Watson 7-yard run into the end zone. On their next series the Herd would add another touchdown on a Chase Litton 66-yard pass to Devonte Allen. The Herd would take a 14 to 0 lead into the second quarter of play.

On a drive started in the previous quarter, Marshall would score again on a Litton 17-yard pass to Ryan Yurachek. On their very next drive of the quarter the Herd would punch it in again on a 6-yard run by Keion Davis. Charlotte would get into Marshall's redzone on the ensuing drive, but would be forced to settle for a Blake Brewer 34-yard field goal to avoid a shutout. After the 49ers defense finally kept the Herd from finding the end zone, Marshall would settle for a 32-yard Nick Smith field goal. At the half the Thundering Herd had a commanding 31 to 3 lead.

Marshall would drive to the 49ers' 20 yard line to open the second half, but with the 49ers finally finding a defensive rhythm, Marshall would settle for a field goal attempt. Smith's 37-yard attempt would fail to split the uprights. Marshall's next drive would end in similar fashion, with Smith missing from 39 yards on this attempt. After Charlotte fumbled away the ball on the opening play of the next series, facing a renewed effort from Charlotte's defense, Marshall would turn the ball over on downs. Charlotte's defense would keep Marshall from scoring in this quarter, but the offense was unable to make headway, so the score remained as it was at the half, with Marshall still up 31 to 3.

On their opening series of the fourth quarter, Marshall's prolific offense would reach the 49ers' redzone again, only to have to settle for a Nick Smith 39-yard field goal. Charlotte's Lee McNeill would be intercepted by Marshall's Corey Tindal two plays later, but Marshall was forced to punt the ball back four plays later. Charlotte would then string together a 13 play drive and finally find the end zone on a Kalif Phillips 6-yard run. Despite a superlative second half effort from the Charlotte defense that resulted in holding the conference's best offense to a field goal, the first half score was too much to overcome. The defending conference champs would return to West Virginia with a 34 to 10 win over the 49ers.

Top performances of the game included Marshall Quarterback Chase Litton, who threw for 486 yards and 2 touchdowns. Charlotte's Kalif Phillips had 23 carries for 99 yards and a touchdown. Marshall's Davonte Allen had 12 receptions for 232 yards and a touchdown.

Game notes:

- First game in program history where the 49ers faced a defending conference champion.
- Kalif Phillips became the first Niner to gain 3,000 yards in his career.

=== Florida International Panthers ===
Florida International vs. Charlotte

Team	1	2	3	4	Total
49ers	7	3	7	14	31
• Panthers	14	20	7	7	48

- Date: November 7
- Location: FIU Stadium
  Miami, FL
- Game start: 12:06 pm EST
- Elapsed time: 3:03
- Game attendance: 14,200
- Game weather: 86 °F (30 °C), Mostly Cloudy, 14 mph (23 km/h)
- Referee: Joe Pester
- TV announcers (ASN, WCCB): Dave Armstrong, Michael Young, Madi Morris

Scoring summary
1	13:09	FIU	Kenyatta ANDERSON 0 yd return of blocked punt (Austin TAYLOR kick)	FIU 7–0
1	9:49	CHAR	Austin DUKE 29 yd pass from Lee MCNEILL (Blake BREWER kick)	TIE 7–7
1	4:24	FIU	Clinton TAYLOR 15 yd pass from Alex McGough (Austin TAYLOR kick)	FIU 14–7
2	14:52	FIU	Alex GARDNER 1 yd run (Austin TAYLOR kick)	FIU 21–7
2	0:56	FIU	Clinton TAYLOR 24 yd pass from Alex MCGOUGH (Austin TAYLOR kick failed)	FIU 27–7
2	0:49	FIU	Alex GARDNER 9 yd run (Austin TAYLOR kick)	FIU 34–7
2	0:00	CHAR	Blake BREWER 56 yd field goal	FIU 34–10
3	12:56	CHAR	Austin DUKE 36 yd pass from Matt JOHNSON (Blake BREWER kick)	FIU 34–17
3	4:11	FIU	Niko GONZALEZ 0 yd interception return (Austin TAYLOR kick)	FIU 41–17
4	13:09	CHAR	Austin DUKE 15 yd pass from Brooks BARDEN (Blake BREWER kick)	FIU 41–24
4	8:02	FIU	Thomas OWENS 2 yd pass from Alex MCGOUGH (Austin TAYLOR kick)	FIU 48–24
4	1:54	CHAR	Brooks BARDEN 5 yd run (Blake BREWER kick)	FIU 48–31

The 49ers visited the State of Florida for the first time to take on their second set of Panthers in the season. This time conference foe Florida International.

After the first series of the game ended in a three and out, Charlotte punter Arthur Hart would have his punt attempt blocked by FIU's Kenyatta Anderson and recovered by him in the end zone for a touchdown. On their next drive the 49ers would tie the score up on a Lee McNeill 29-yard pass to Austin Duke. The Panthers would regain the lead on the next series off an Alex McGough 15-yard pass to Clinton Taylor. The score at the end of the quarter was FUI 14, Charlotte 7.

FIU would stretch the lead on their first series of the second quarter with an Alex Gardner 1-yard rushing touchdown. Charlotte's Blake Brewer would miss a 45-yard field goal on Charlotte's next possession. On the Panthers' next possession Austin Taylor would also miss a field goal, this one from 37 yards. Near the end of the half FIU's McGough would find Clinton Taylor again for a 24-yard pass. Following the missed point after attempt FIU would recover an on-sides kick. On the next play Alex Gardner punched in a 9-yard touchdown run. On the ensuing series Charlotte's Blake Brewer would connect on a field goal from 56 yards out to end the half. The score at halftime was FIU up 34 to 10.

On their first possession of the second half the 49ers would strike quickly on a five play drive that finished on a Matt Johnson 36-yard touchdown pass to Austin Duke. Later in the quarter Charlotte's Brooks Barden would be intercepted by FIU's Niko Gonzalez who would return it 58 yards for a touchdown. On FIU's next possession McGough would be intercepted by the 49ers' Anthony Covington. The score at the end of the third quarter was Panthers up 41 to 17.

The interception at the end of the third quarter would result in a seven play drive that culminated in a Brooks Barden 15-yard pass to Austin Duke, Duke's third touchdown pass of the day. FIU would return the favor on their next drive with a McGough 2-yard pass to Thomas Owens in the end zone. Charlotte would string together an eighteen play drive that would end on a Brooks Barden 5 yard quarterback-keeper touchdown, but it would not be enough as Florida International would win the game 48 to 38.

Top performances of the game included FIU quarterback Alex McGough who threw for 284 yards with 3 touchdowns and an interception. FIU rusher Alex Gardner had 19 carries for 76 yards and 2 touchdowns. Charlotte's Austin Duke had 8 receptions for 115 yards and 3 touchdowns.

Game notes:

- First game in program history played in Florida.
- Blake Brewer's 56-yard field goal to close the first half set not only a Charlotte 49ers record, but also a new distance record at FIU Stadium and the season record in Conference USA.
- First game for Charlotte in which 3 quarterbacks (L. McNeill, M. Johnson, and B. Barden) threw 3 touchdown passes, all to Austin Duke.

=== UTSA Roadrunners ===
UTSA vs. Charlotte

Team	1	2	3	4	OT	Total
• Roadrunners	0	0	20	7	3	30
49ers	0	7	14	6	0	27

- Date: November 14
- Location: Jerry Richardson Stadium
  Charlotte, NC
- Game start: 2:05 pm EST
- Elapsed time: 3:41
- Game attendance: 11,331
- Game weather: 60 °F (16 °C), Clear, 8 mph (13 km/h)
- Referee: Javarro Edwards
- TV announcers (Fox Sports): Mike Morgan, JC Pearson, Steffi Sorensen

Scoring summary
2	2:28	CHAR	Richard MURPHY 8 yd pass from Matt JOHNSON (Blake BREWER kick)	CHAR 7–0
3	13:49	UTSA	Jalen RHODES 8 yd run (Victor FALCON kick)	TIED 7–7
3	11:35	CHAR	Richard MURPHY 18 yd pass from Brooks BARDEN (Blake BREWER kick)	CHAR 14–7
3	10:11	UTSA	Jarveon WILLIAMS 24 yd run (Victor FALCON kick)	TIED 14–14
3	7:23	UTSA	Kerry THOMAS JR. 7 yd pass from Dalton STURM (Daniel PORTILLO kick failed)	UTSA 20–14
3	5:15	CHAR	Trent BOSTICK 42 yd pass from Matt JOHNSON (Blake BREWER kick)	CHAR 21–20
4	11:53	CHAR	Blake BREWER 41 yd field goal	CHAR 24–20
4	7:56	UTSA	Aaron GRUBB 26 yd pass from Dalton STURM (Daniel PORTILLO kick)	UTSA 27–24
4	1:11	CHAR	Blake BREWER 37 yd field goal	TIED 27–27
OT	15:00	UTSA	Daniel PORTILLO 22 yd field goal	UTSA 30–27

This Senior Day conference match-up of recent start-up football programs featured the 49ers taking on their first BCS National Championship winning head coach in UTSA's Larry Coker.

On their first possession of the game UTSA would get to Charlotte's red zone only to have Dalton Sturm's pass intercepted by Charlotte's Terrence Winchester. Charlotte would return the favor six plays later when Brooks Barden's pass was intercepted by the Roadrunners' Bennett Okotch. Three series later Sturm would again have a pass intercepted, this time by the 49ers' Devin Pearson. The resulting series for the Niners would carry over to the second quarter with neither team scoring in the first quarter.

Unable to find the end zone, Charlotte would have to settle for a long field goal attempt, but Blake Brewer's 52-yard attempt would miss. On their first possession of the second quarter the Roadrunner's would also miss a Damiel Portillo 44-yard field goal attempt. After both teams ended their next series on punt returns, Charlotte's Matt Johnson would find Richard Murphy on an 8-yard touchdown pass. On the next play from scrimmage Dalton would throw his third interception to the 49ers' Daquan Lucas. The score at the half was Charlotte up 7 to 0.

On the first series of the second half, following a 68-yard breakaway run by the Roadrunner's Jarveon Williams to get into scoring position, Jalen Rhodes would punch it in to tie the game at 7 all. On the Niners' next possession Barden would get Murphy his second touchdown pass, this time from 18 yards out. On the next drive Jarveon Williams would tie the score again with a 24-yard touchdown run. On their next possession Sturm would get the Roadrunners their first lead of the day on a 7-yard pass to Kerry Thomas Jr., but Portillo's point after attempt would miss. On the subsequent drive the 49ers would regain the lead after Matt Johnson found Trent Bostick for a 42-yard touchdown pass. The third quarter would end with Charlotte up 21 to 20.

The Niners' first series of the fourth quarter would end on a Blake Brewer 41-yard field goal. On the 49ers' next possession Brewer would miss from 43 yards away. On the very next series the Roadrunner's would retake the lead on a Sturm 26-yard pass to Aaron Grubb. The 49ers would then string together a fifteen play drive that ended with Brewer tying the score at 27 all on a 37-yard field goal. On UTSA's next possession Victor Falcon's 52 game-winning field goal attempt would miss at the end of regulation time. Both teams would enter over time at 27 points all.

Charlotte won the first possession of the over time period, but Matt Johnson's end zone pass attempt would be intercepted by the Roadrunner's Nate Gaines. UTSA would run seven plays to get Portillo into position, who would win the game for the Roadrunners on a successful 22-yard field goal. Senior Day would end in devastating fashion as the 49ers would fall in over time, 30 to 27.

Top performances of the game included UTSA quarterback Dalton Sturm who threw for 133 yards with 2 touchdowns and 2 interceptions. UTSA rusher Jarveon Williams had 19 carries for 181 yards and a touchdown. Charlotte's Trent Bostick had 3 receptions for 79 yards and a touchdown.

Game notes:

- Twelve 49ers would participate in their final home collegiate game: Danny Book, Andrew Buie, Caleb Clayton-Molby, Branden Dozier, Desmond Floyd, Eric Herkley, Ardy Holmes, Devon Johnson, Richard Murphy, Cortezz Nixon, Zach Thomas, Joe Wolljung.
- Larry Ogunjobi broke his own single-game school records with a single game 4.5 tackles for loss and 13.5 TFL's on the season.
- Terrance Winchester had his school-record 8th career takeaway with his third interception of the year. Winchester has five takeaways to break the single-season school record of four and he has three interceptions to match the single-season school record.

=== Kentucky Wildcats ===
Kentucky vs. Charlotte

Team	1	2	3	4	Total
49ers	0	3	0	7	10
• Wildcats	10	10	17	21	58

- Date: November 21
- Location: Commonwealth Stadium
  Lexington, KY
- Game start: 7:39 pm EST
- Elapsed time: 3:12
- Game attendance: 56,195
- Game weather: 38 °F (3 °C), Cloudy, 17 mph (27 km/h) W
- Referee: Tom Ritter
- TV announcers (SEC Alt.): Dave Baker, Clint Stoerner

Scoring summary
1	8:14	UK	Jojo KEMP 6 yd run (Miles BUTLER kick)	UK 7–0
1	0:15	UK	Miles BUTLER 21 yd field goal	UK 10–0
2	13:04	CHAR	Blake BREWER 23 yd field goal	UK 10–3
2	7:53	UK	Jojo KEMP 18 yd run (Miles BUTLER kick)	UK 17–3
2	2:46	UK	Miles BUTLER 46 yd field goal	UK 20–3
3	13:05	UK	Stanley WILLIAMS 20 yd run (Miles BUTLER kick)	UK 27–3
3	6:17	UK	Stanley WILLIAMS 53 yd run (Miles BUTLER kick)	UK 34–3
3	2:39	UK	Miles BUTLER 32 yd field goal	UK 37–3
4	14:20	UK	Jojo KEMP 47 yd run (Miles BUTLER kick)	UK 44–3
4	13:08	UK	Mike EDWARDS 20 yd interception return (Miles BUTLER kick)	UK 51–3
4	10:22	UK	Sihiem KING 62 yd run (Miles BUTLER kick)	UK 58–3
4	4:54	CHAR	Zach BUMGARNER 3 yd pass from Brooks BARDEN (Blake BREWER kick)	UK 58–10

The 49ers took on their first Power 5 and SEC foes when they visited the Blue Grass State to take on the Kentucky Wildcats.

On their second possession of the game, the Wildcats' Jojo Kemp would score from 6 yards out. On their next series the Wildcats' Miles Butler would split the uprights from 21 yards away. The first quarter would end with Kentucky up 10 to 0.

On their first series of the second quarter the 49ers' Blake Brewer would get the Niners on the board with a 23-yard field goal. On the next series Kentucky would stretch their lead on another Jojo Kemp rushing touchdown from 18 yards out. On their next possession Butler would connect on a 46-yard field goal. The game would go to halftime with the Wildcats up 20 to 0.

On the first series of the second half the Wildcats would force the 49ers to punt, but Arthur Hart would fumble the ball away to Kentucky's Kent Denzil Ware near the Wildcat's end zone. On the very next play Kentucky's Stanley Williams would punch it in for a 20-yard touchdown run. After three straight series ended in punts, the Wildcats would get a quick strike touchdown on Stanley Williams' 53 yard breakaway run. On the next series Charlotte's Brooks Barden would be intercepted by Kentucky's Cory Johnson. Four plays later and Butler would again get a field goal, this time from 32 yards away. At the end of the third quarter Kentucky would have a commanding 37 to 3 lead.

The final quarter of play saw Jojo Kemp get his third rushing touchdown of the day on the first possession, a 47-yard sprint to the end zone. On the third play of Charlotte's next possession Barden would again be intercepted, this time to devastating effect as Mike Edwards would return it 20 yards for a defensive touchdown. On their next possession Kentucky's Sihiem King would go 62 yards on the second play for another touchdown. On the Wildcat's next series on the first play Mikel Horton would fumble it away to Charlotte's Daquan Lucas. Two plays later Barden would find Zach Bumgardner for a three-yard touchdown pass. The Wildcats would hold on to the ball for the rest of the game with the final score of Kentucky 58, Charlotte 10.

Top performances for the game were dominated by Kentucky. Wildcat's quarterback Drew Barker had 129 yards passing. Kentucky rusher Jojo Kemp had 11 carries for 164 yards and 3 touchdowns. Wildcat's receiver Jeff Badet had 4 receptions for 39 yards.

Game notes:

- First Power 5 conference opponent.
- First SEC opponent.
- First game with snow (flurries at the start of the second half).

=== Rice Owls ===
Rice vs. Charlotte

Team	1	2	3	4	Total
49ers	0	0	0	7	7
• Owls	0	0	10	17	27

- Date: November 28
- Location: Rice Stadium
  Houston, TX
- Game start: 2:30 pm CST
- Elapsed time: 3:03
- Game attendance: 16,539
- Game weather: 52 °F (11 °C), Rainy, 5 mph (8.0 km/h)
- Referee: Ken Antee
- TV announcers (ASN, WCCB): Ron Thulin, Keith Moreland

Scoring summary
3	9:51	RICE	Hayden TOBOLA 19 yd field goal	RICE 3–0
3	3:09	RICE	Cole Hunt 4 yd pass from Luke TURNER (Hayden TOBOLA kick)	RICE 10–0
4	11:50	RICE	Driphus JACKSON 3 yd run (Hayden TOBOLA kick)	RICE17-0
4	8:01	RICE	Hayden TOBOLA 23 yd field goal	RICE 20–0
4	3:13	RICE	Jowan DAVIS 11 yd run (Hayden TOBOLA kick)	RICE 27–0
4	2:16	CHAR	Trent BOSTICK 56 yd pass from Matt JOHNSON (Blake BREWER kick)	RICE 27–7

The 49ers faced their third set of "Owls" to close out the regular season, when they paid their first visit to the Lone Star State to take on Rice.

On their first possession of the game, the Owls would get into scoring range, but Hayden Tobola would miss the field goal from 22 yards away. On their next possession, Driphus Jackson's pass into the end zone would be intercepted by Charlotte's Terrance Winchester for a touchback. That would set the 49ers up for a drive to the Owl's redzone in the next quarter. The score at the end of the first quarter was 0 all.

Capping their drive off the interception from the first quarter the Niners would get into scoring range early in the second quarter, but Blake Brewer's 27-yard field goal attempt would sail wide of the uprights. Nearer the end of the half, Brewer would get another chance, but the 33-yard attempt would again sail wide on him. On their next drive and the final drive of the half for the Niners, another Brewer field goal attempt, this one from 42 yards away, would again sail wide on him; marking Brewer's 3rd failed field goal attempt of the half. The score at halftime was 0 all.

On the first drive of the second half, Rice would get to Charlotte's 2-yard line; but a stout effort from the 49ers' defense would result in a Hayden Tobola 19-yard field goal instead, giving Rice the lead and marking the first points of the game. On their next possession, the Owls would find the end zone on a trick play with rusher Luke Turner's surprise 4-yard pass to Cole Hunt for the touchdown. The third quarter would end halfway through the Owls' next drive with them up 10 to 0 on the 49ers.

The drive the Owls started at the end of the third quarter would bear fruit at the start of the fourth quarter as Driphus Jackson would keep it for a 3-yard scoring run. Charlotte would then turn the ball over on downs, resulting eleven plays later in a Tobola 23-yard field goal. On their next possession, the Owls' Jowan Davis would cap the drive with an 11-yard scoring run to put the game out of reach. Charlotte would get a quick strike touchdown pass of 56 yards from Matt Johnson to Trent Bostick to avoid the program's first-ever shutout, but Brewer's on sides attempt would be recovered by the Owls who would end the game with the ball. The final score was Rice 27, Charlotte 7.

Top performances of the game included Charlotte quarterback Matt Johnson who threw for 72 yards with a touchdown. Rice rusher Austin Walter had 12 carries for 78 yards. Charlotte's Trent Bostick had 6 receptions for 111 yards and a touchdown.

Game notes:

- First game in program history played in Texas.
- Redshirt senior offensive tackle Danny Book ended his collegiate career having started all 34 games in program history.
- Book also became the first 49er honored with wearing the #49 jersey twice in a single season. He has worn the #49 jersey four times during his career, which is the most of any player so far.
- Redshirt junior nose tackle Larry Ogunjobi also has started all 34 games in program history.
- Ogunjobi's 7 game tackles made him the first 49er with more than 150 tackles on his career (152 tackles).

== Attendance ==
Season	Games	Sellouts	W–L (%)	Attendance	Average	Best
2015	6	3	1–5 (.167)	87,603	14,606	17,444
