= The Canyons (film) =

2013 American erotic thriller-drama film

- Theatrical release poster
- Directed by: Paul Schrader
- Written by: Bret Easton Ellis
- Produced by: Braxton Pope
- Starring: Lindsay Lohan; James Deen
- Cinematography: John DeFazio
- Edited by: Tim Silano
- Music by: Brendan Canning; Me&John
- Production companies: Post Empire Films; Sodium Fox; Prettybird Pictures
- Distributed by: IFC Films
- Release dates: July 29, 2013 (Lincoln Center); August 2, 2013 (United States)
- Running time: 99 minutes
- Country: United States
- Language: English
- Budget: $250,000
- Box office: $265,670

The Canyons is a 2013 American erotic thriller-drama film directed by Paul Schrader and written by Bret Easton Ellis. The film is set in Los Angeles, California and stars Lindsay Lohan, James Deen, Nolan Funk, Amanda Brooks, and Gus Van Sant. It received a limited release on August 2, 2013, at the IFC Center in New York, the TIFF Lightbox in Toronto, and on video on demand platforms. The film was met with generally negative critical reviews, but Lohan's performance received some praise.

== Plot ==
Christian is a wealthy young man who produces low-budget horror films. At the start of the film, he is having dinner with his girlfriend, Tara, his personal assistant, Gina, and her boyfriend, Ryan. Christian has recently secured a leading role for Ryan in one of his films. Christian reveals that he and Tara have an open relationship and use dating apps to find partners for hookups. He says that he trusts Tara never to fall in love with anyone he brings into their bed.

Ryan accuses Gina of wanting to have a four-way with Tara and Christian. Ryan texts an unknown party for a meeting the next day. Ryan's text was sent to Tara, who meets him the next day. Through their conversation, it is revealed that the two are former lovers. Tired of life as a struggling actor, Tara left Ryan to date a string of wealthy men. Tara chides Ryan for texting her, as Christian monitors her texts and calls. Christian visits an actress named Cynthia for casual sex. Christian thinks Tara is cheating on him. Christian follows Tara and sees her with Ryan. Christian then goes to John, one of the film crew members, and pressures him into playing a prank on Ryan: calling him in to tell him that he's about to be fired but can save his job by performing sexual favors.

Returning home, Christian grills Tara on her activities that afternoon. Tara denies being attracted to Ryan or knowing him previously. Meanwhile, Ryan discovers Christian's daily schedule on Gina's computer, noticing regular "yoga sessions" with Cynthia.

Tara receives an anonymous text telling her she might be in trouble. Cynthia is revealed to have been Christian's girlfriend before Tara. Cynthia tells Tara that she must leave Christian and admits to sending the anonymous texts. Cynthia reveals that she left Christian after he drugged her, orchestrated a group assault on her, and recorded the incident. When confronted, he brutally assaulted her and threatened to release the video if she told anyone. Tara rejects Cynthia's warnings.

Christian acknowledges dating Cynthia but denies beating her or arranging an assault. Suddenly his phone rings; a dating app friend is about to arrive. Christian offers to cancel but Tara insists they go through with it. Tara and Christian engage in group sex with the couple who arrive at the house and Tara "directs" Christian to perform homosexual acts he later feels uncomfortable about.

Meanwhile, it is revealed that Ryan put Cynthia up to warning Tara. While browsing at a record store Ryan realizes he is being stalked. Christian violently assaults Tara, revealing that he knows all about her and Ryan.

Ryan reveals to Gina that he has been sleeping with Tara. Gina announces she will do whatever it takes to make sure the film gets made but Ryan is fired and banned from the set.

At his therapist's office, Christian discusses feeling out of control when Tara was directing his actions, saying he is more comfortable and used to telling others what to do. It is revealed that Christian's therapy sessions with Doctor Campbell (Gus Van Sant) are not voluntary, but rather a condition of the trust fund he lives off.

The film then cuts to Christian and Ryan, each driving through downtown Los Angeles. Christian leaves a message on Ryan's voicemail, mocking Ryan and revealing the details he has obtained about Ryan's life. Christian arrives at Cynthia's house, accusing her of lying in an attempt to break up his relationship with Tara. Cynthia denies this but Christian, enraged, stabs her to death.

Returning home, Christian finds Tara packed and ready to leave. Christian apologizes for brutalizing her and agrees to let her leave their relationship on two conditions: she must give him an alibi for his murder of Cynthia and she must never contact Ryan. If she refuses, he will murder Ryan and use his family's wealth and connections to get away with it. Tara agrees and is allowed to leave.

Several months later, Tara is living in Dubai and having lunch with a friend. The friend asks about Gina's film and her relationship with Christian. Tara says she left the project when she and Christian broke up. She insists she is on good terms with Christian. The friend leaves to use the restroom, where she makes a phone call. She reports that Tara is doing well but clearly lying about being friends with Christian and being happy in her new life. On the other end of the call is Ryan, alone in an empty room.

== Cast ==
- Lindsay Lohan as Tara
- James Deen as Christian
- Nolan Funk as Ryan
- Amanda Brooks as Gina
- Tenille Houston as Cynthia Grey
- Gus Van Sant as Dr. Campbell
- Chris Zeischegg as Reid
- Victor of Aquitaine as Randall
- Lauren Schacher as Caitlin
- Jim Boeven as Jon
- Philip Pavel as Erik

== Development ==
=== Production and marketing ===
Braxton Pope, Bret Easton Ellis and Paul Schrader were originally involved in a film project, Bait. When the project lost its financing, Pope, Ellis, and Schrader decided they wanted to make a lower-scale film. Ellis was in charge of writing the script. After it was completed, Pope suggested raising money via Kickstarter. Throughout May–June 2012, the film raised $159,015, with a goal of $100,000 in funding. The budget for the film was $250,000 and the actors were reportedly paid $100 a day. Schrader talked about how it affected his artistic options, saying, "if you've made enough films you really know what you need money for and what you don't need money for. There's virtually nothing on the cutting-room floor for this film – you shoot straight to the bone."

On July 13, it was announced that Brendan Canning would be scoring the film. On July 18, 2012, the official press release for the movie was published on the Facebook page of The Canyons. On July 24, 2012, it was announced that American Apparel would be supplying the cast with wardrobe and was planning to issue logo T-shirts based on Ellis, The Canyons, and Schrader.

The first teaser was released on YouTube on June 16, 2012. On October 8, a "retro style" teaser trailer was released. IndieWire called The Canyons one of the "50 Indie Films We Want To See In 2013" in January 2013. On August 2, 2013, rapper Kanye West released a new version of the trailer; he worked with Nate Brown on the re-editing and created new music with Noah Goldstein.

Following the film's release, Schrader accused Lohan of not supporting the film, saying she had pulled out of interviews and never showed up for promotional photo sessions. In the docu-series Lindsay, which chronicles (in eight one-hour episodes) Lindsay Lohan's return from her sixth stay in rehab for addiction and her attempts to revitalize her career, she claimed that she did not end up promoting The Canyons, specifically its Venice Film Festival screening, because it would have placed her in a situation that compromised her sobriety.

=== Casting ===
Casting of The Canyons was operated through the casting website Let It Cast, where an audition scene was made available for download and actors were encouraged to film their own video auditions. As Pope and Ellis explained in a video on Let It Cast, the motivation to cast in this fashion was to facilitate submissions from talented actors who might not otherwise be seen given the time constraints of the traditional casting process, as well as to open a direct channel to actors whose talent agents might complicate the process. Paul Schrader wrote a full account of the process of casting the seven actors cast through their Let It Cast auditions. Lead actors Lindsay Lohan and James Deen were cast independently of this process.

Although Schrader, Ellis, and Pope initially favored French actress Leslie Coutterand (who auditioned through Let It Cast), the role of Tara ultimately went to Lohan. When Pope approached Lohan's manager about the possibility of Lohan playing the role of Cynthia, Lohan responded that she wanted to play the lead. Two weeks later, she screen tested and was cast. Pope said, "She's very charismatic and she has a lot of acting skills...So for this part, we felt that she was really the right actor for a host of different reasons." Fleur Saville was also considered for the role of Tara.

Early on, the filmmakers considered casting Sean Brosnan as Christian, but later decided they wanted to cast someone "more edgy and unexpected". Ellis had mentioned several times that he had Deen in mind for Christian's role and when he, Pope and Deen met, Deen was promised a screen test. Schrader was reluctant at first, thinking it unlikely he would cast Deen due to his background in porn. Although surprised by Deen's acting abilities and charisma, Schrader was still reluctant to cast him; but, with Ellis and Pope, was intrigued by the idea of casting Lohan and Deen in the leads. Alex Meraz and Daren Kagasoff were also considered for the role, among others.

Funk was cast as Ryan. Other actors who had been considered for Ryan's role included gay porn star Sean Paul Lockhart, Alex Ashbaugh, who was cast in a different role, Zach Roerig, and Chris Schellenger, who was also given a different, smaller role in the film. Gina was cast through Let It Cast, with the goal being finding the best counterpoint to Lohan, in physical appearance and personality. After many auditions, Brooks was cast. Spencer Grammer and Jessica Morris were considered, among others. Cynthia was originally called Lindsay, but the character's name was changed so she wouldn't be confused with Lohan. She was also cast through Let It Cast, and the primary criterion for the actress was to balance Lohan and Brooks. Houston's audition was sent in early and remained a favorite. Other actresses who had been considered included Fleur Saville and Cameron Richardson. In tertiary roles, Boeven was cast as John, and Aquitaine was cast as Randall. Philip Pavel, who was cast as Erik, had also been considered, among others. Caitlin's character was originally supposed to be cast through Let It Cast, but was ultimately cast through mobli due to Pope's preference. Lauren Schacher was cast.

Director Gus Van Sant's casting in the role of Christian's psychotherapist was reported in July 2012. Schrader originally wanted to cast Willem Dafoe as the therapist: "Willem Dafoe wasn't in town, and I asked somebody else, and they were working. So I turned to Braxton and said, 'What friends do you have?'"

When asked about casting The Canyons, Ellis stated: "Dealing with the casting of The Canyons was a great, liberating process—for both the production team and for actors in general. We used Let It Cast and saw some amazing actors that we will definitely keep in mind for future projects. The way the entire cast came together so quickly was a thrill and everyone who landed their roles deserved them. Using social media as a way to help build a film is really like riding the wave into the future." Pope said, "Nothing about this film was orchestrated in a traditional way. We wanted to actively embrace all the digital and social media tools at our disposal and give the film real cinematic value—The Canyons is the result of a forward thinking experiment with a terrific cast." Schrader said: "Bret Easton Ellis' characters are beautiful people doing bad things in nice rooms. Lindsay Lohan and James Deen not only have the acting talent; they also have that screen quality that keeps you watching their every move."

=== Filming and editing ===
Principal photography began in July 2012 with the shooting of the first six minutes of the film in the bar of the Chateau Marmont in Los Angeles. Many key scenes were shot at the Malibu home of designer Vitus Mataré. Filming was moved to Westfield Century City mall in Los Angeles after a failed attempt to film at the Santa Monica Promenade. Scenes were also shot in Amoeba Records on Sunset Boulevard, Hollywood, and Cafe Med restaurant at Sunset Plaza, West Hollywood, as well as Palihotel Melrose and The Churchill bar of The Orlando Hotel, both in the Beverly Grove neighborhood of Los Angeles.

Schrader says about filming The Canyons: "...we're making art out of the remains of our empire. The junk that's left over. And this idea of a film that was crowdfunded, cast online, with one actor from a celebrity culture, one actor from adult-film culture, a writer and director who have gotten beat up in the past—felt like a post-Empire thing. And then everything I was afraid of with Lindsay and James started to become a positive. I was afraid we wouldn't be taken seriously and people would think it was a joke. My son and daughter didn't want me to do it. That just shows you how conservative young kids are."

The rough cut of the film was 1 hour 44 minutes long. Initial edits of the film were disappointing; the film was said to "drag". Ellis, Schrader and Pope had a disagreement over the final cut of the film. After Schrader showed Steven Soderbergh the rough cut of the film, Soderbergh offered to cut it within three days. Schrader declined, telling The New York Times: "The idea of 72 hours is a joke, it would take him 72 hours to look at all the footage. And you know what Soderbergh would do if another director offered to cut his film? [Puts up two middle fingers] That's what Soderbergh would do." Pope stated he and Ellis "were excited" about Soderbergh's offer but it was ultimately Schrader's decision. Ellis is quoted as saying: "The film is so languorous. It's an hour 30, and it seems like it's three hours long. I saw this as a pranky noirish thriller, but Schrader turned it into, well, a Schrader film."

On Ellis' Podcast, he claims to now have a new appreciation of the film, saying he had trouble at first accepting Schrader's vision of his material, but in the end, has come to an understanding over his reservations during the creative process. He also openly praises Lohan's performance, calling it "searing," and blames the film's perceived 'failures' on Lohan's reputation in the media, which has nothing to do about the film's quality or her performance in the film. He continued with saying he believes The Canyons to have ended up as being a success both creatively and financially for all those involved. He concludes with saying he is very proud of the final product.

== Release ==
The film was not accepted by the Sundance Film Festival, but was scheduled for sale in January 2013 by William Morris Endeavor. It was also publicly rejected by SXSW citing they had "quality issues" with the film, which enraged director Paul Schrader, who was very proud of his final film. IFC Films bought the rights to distribute the film theatrically, accompanied by a special screening at the Film Society of Lincoln Center (on July 29, 2013) featuring a conversation session with director Paul Schrader and the film critic/New York Film Festival Program Director Kent Jones. It was released on August 2, 2013, in the United States at the IFC Center in New York City, the Bell Lightbox in Toronto, and on video on demand platforms. It was shown in the out of competition section at the 70th Venice International Film Festival. The film was also featured on the cover of the July/August 2013 (Volume 49/Number 4) issue of Film Comment Magazine, featuring a full centerpiece article on the film's production. The issue featured an article, by Schrader, on the hardships and merits of working with Lindsay Lohan.

The Canyons was given an R rating for "strong sexual content including graphic nudity, language throughout, a bloody crime scene, and brief drug use".

=== Critical response ===
==== Contemporary ====
The review aggregation website Rotten Tomatoes reported a 21% approval rating for The Canyons, based on 95 reviews, with an average score of 4/10. The site's consensus says the film "serves as a sour footnote in Paul Schrader's career—but it does feature some decent late-period work from Lindsay Lohan". At Metacritic, which assigns a weighted mean rating out of 100 to reviews from mainstream critics, the film received an average score of 36, based on 30 reviews, indicating "generally unfavorable reviews".

Linda Barnard of the Toronto Star gave the film one out of four stars, calling it "a howlingly bad soap-opera-meets-soft-core-porn mash-up". Writing for The Village Voice, Stephanie Zacharek praised Lohan's performance, likening her Tara character to "a nectarine on the far side of ripening, and this isn't a story about innocence lost—she sold that off long ago. But there's a dreaminess about her that could never crystallize into hardness." Zacharek also wrote that the "nuts and bolts of the plot are the least interesting things" about the film.

While the negative response to the film was overwhelming, The Canyons also received some praise. In a glowing review, Richard Brody wrote in The New Yorker that movie "isn’t a study in character but a view of the world; it’s a masterful setting of mood", praising Deen for doing "terrific job exuding a sense of imperious entitlement" and saying that Lohan's "performance itself is electrifyingly alive". Jason Shawhan's Nashville Scene review claimed "Lohan tears into this role with fierce energy, walking the fine line between dominance and desperation." Kent Jones highly praised the film in Film Comment as "a visually and tonally precise, acid-etched horror story of souls wandering through a hyper-materialist hell, with a fearless and, I think, stunning performance by Lindsay Lohan at its center. On another level, it’s an inspiration and an example to us all: it’s difficult for me to imagine another filmmaker of Paul Schrader’s stature diving into the world of crowd-sourced moviemaking, let alone with such fervor, dedication and rigor." Mauricio González of Letras Libres affirmed that "The Canyons is perhaps the most misunderstood film so far this decade."

==== Retrospective ====
In 2022, Aryan Tauqeer Khawaja reassessed The Canyons in Little White Lies, stating that the "much-derided" project is "a sharper take on performance than it first appears", concluding that the film "asserts there's always someone else pulling the strings, making it impossible to extricate oneself from the erosion of self enabled by late capitalism." In an essay for Mubi, Greg Cwik opined that the film "presents an unprecedented and unmitigated perspective on Hollywood's toxic affluence, as judgmental as it is enamored of the iniquitous lives it depicts. It is a mess, certainly, but a fascinating, sometimes brilliant one, and necessary—a bizarre coalescence of influences and talents representative of and germane to the obsessions of its progenitors." In the years following its release, The Canyons received screenings suggestive of a "midnight movie" following, a classification disputed by The Big Ships's Fred Barrett, who observed the film "isn't so-bad-it's-good, it isn't even bad. It's a strange, austere study of postmodernity [...] It's a film that's easy to misunderstand and even easier to dislike but, then again, so much interesting and worthwhile art is." In November 2022, Schrader wrote: "I have an enduring fondness for this film which got caught in the cultural meatgrinder ten years back," claiming that contemporary film critics had "reviewed the phenomenon and not the film." A couple of years prior, Metrograph hosted a screening of the movie followed by a Q&A session with Schrader and Alex Ross Perry, who had previously described The Canyons as "anthropologically fascinating and comprehensive in showing me this ugly side of a horrible culture that I secretly enjoy driving past and looking at."

Vulture's Roxana Hadadi reexamined the movie and called Lohan's performance "the best part" of it and a "persuasive comeback attempt all its own" in retrospect, with "her aura of lived-in disappointment" giving The Canyons "an advantageous cynicism about Hollywood and who survives there." In 2022, Interview Magazine listed it as one of their favorite films inspired by "the Hollywood old and new: fame, excess, nihilism, and, of course fashion." In 2023, Men's Health named the film as one of the 35 greatest erotic thrillers of all time, noting that "while the film is flawed, Lohan is its light [and] delivers one of her career-best performances, indicating that the genre suits her smokey voice and allure." Jim Hemphill also wrote a critical reassessment of the movie for IndieWire, acknowledging its qualities as "an anthropological study and poison pen letter to Hollywood" and stated it "gave Schrader new life as a filmmaker." After being selected for inclusion on the Criterion Channel in June 2024, The Guardian compared The Canyons to Schrader's Hardcore stating the films "deliver dueling eulogies for Tinseltown, portrayed first as a seamy underbelly in 1979 and then as a long-in-decline ghost town by 2013." In December 2025, Brianna Zigler wrote in Us Weekly that the film "has gained a small but steadfast following of fans who consider it to be a misunderstood film," calling it a "difficult but fascinating watch and a sharper commentary on Hollywood, performance and capitalism than it's given credit for."

=== Accolades ===
The Canyons was screened as a part of the 14th Melbourne Underground Film Festival and won four awards:

- Best Female Actor for Lindsay Lohan
- Best Screenplay for Bret Easton Ellis
- Best Foreign Director for Paul Schrader
- Best Foreign Film

=== Home media ===
The Canyons made its DVD and Blu-ray debut on November 26, 2013, courtesy of MPI Media Group. The release included a 100-minute 'Unrated Director's Cut' of the film. The new cut of the film only runs about a minute longer than the version that was in theaters and video on demand. During a "live tweet" session of the film on Twitter, where Bret Easton Ellis via his own Twitter account and Paul Schrader using The Canyons' account, discussed their feelings on and experiences with making the film- while viewers watched from home. Here they confessed that a sex scene had to be edited down for the final cut. A sex scene at the beginning of the film, which featured the characters of Tara, Christian and Reid (Danny Wylde), had to have cuts made to meet the content standards of iTunes. Thus the shots of Reid indulging in masturbation had to go, since they were unsimulated, unlike the other sexual content shown in the film. These shots were included in the version of the film shown at the Film Society of Lincoln Center screening but did not appear in the theatrical or video on demand edit. These shots are restored in the 'Unrated Director's Cut' available on Blu-ray and DVD. A DVD has also been made available featuring the edited version, which the MPAA gave an R Rating in the United States. In January 2025, Vinegar Syndrome released a limited edition Blu-ray of The Canyons with new artwork and bonus features, including audio commentary by film historian Adrian Martin and a video interview with Schrader.

=== Box office ===
Debuting only at the IFC Center in the U.S., the film earned $13,351 by the end of its opening weekend. On video on demand and iTunes, the film was said to do "extremely well". The film has grossed a total of $56,825 in United States and $265,670 all around the world. IFC Films has not released the Video on Demand profits of the film, but Bret Easton Ellis, on his Podcast, claimed "The Canyons was, something like, the number one Video on Demand film IFC released last year. The film has made a profit."

== Soundtrack ==
The Canyons (Original Motion Picture Soundtrack)

Soundtrack album by Brendan Canning with Me&John
- Released: July 30, 2013
- Genres: Electronic, synthpop, rock
- Length: 43:44
- Label: SQE Music
- Producers: Brendan Canning with Me&John

The soundtrack was made by Brendan Canning with Me&John and features songs by Gold Zebra, A Place to Bury Strangers, and the Dum Dum Girls. It was released on July 30, 2013.

1. "Canyons Theme"
2. "Without the Night" (featuring Adaline)
3. "No More Sympathy" (featuring Rob James)
4. "Back Home to Michigan"
5. "Son of Perdition"
6. "Teil Cock"
7. "Love, French, Better" - Gold Zebra
8. "Soon to Be"
9. "Fear" - A Place to Bury Strangers
10. "This Isn't Good for You"
11. "Driving Sines"
12. "Goddamn So High" (featuring Adaline)
13. "My Preacher's Daughter" (featuring Adaline)
14. "Coming Down" - Dum Dum Girls
