= Joe Tereshinski =

Joe Tereshinski may refer to:

- Joe Tereshinski III (born 1983), American football player
- Joe Tereshinski Sr. (1923–2013), American football player
