= Schacher =

Schacher is a surname. Notable people with the surname include:

- Lauren Schacher (born 1985), American actress and screenwriter
- Mel Schacher (born 1951), American rock bass guitarist
