= Athens Academy (school) =

Private prep school in Athens, Georgia, US

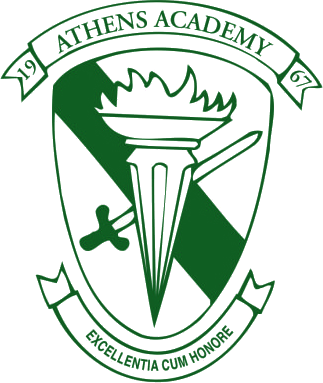

Location
- 1281 Spartan Lane; Athens, Georgia; United States; 33°54′01″N 83°24′09″W

Information
- Type: Private
- Motto: Excellentia Cum Honore (Excellence With Honor)
- Established: 1967
- Founders: John Wilkins, John E. Griffin, Harold E. Beasley, Harvey Cabaniss, Tommy Tillman, Mary T. Erwin
- Principal: Colleen Burwell (Preschool); Mark Cunningham (Lower School); Jeff Stachura (Middle School); Susan Zalac (Upper School)
- Headmaster: John Thorsen
- Grades: K3–12
- Gender: Coeducational
- Enrollment: 945
- Campus: 152 acres (61.5 hectares)
- Colors: Green, white and silver
- Mascot: Spartan
- Newspaper: Spartan Review
- Yearbook: Academia
- Affiliation: Independent
- Website: www.athensacademy.org

Athens Academy is a private, co-educational, college preparatory school in Athens, Georgia. As of 2017, the school enrollment is approximately 945 students.

== History ==
Athens Academy was founded on September 6, 1967 in Athens, Georgia. According to the school's website, the vision of Athens Academy's founders, as articulated in their original charter, was to establish a school for students from "diverse social, economic, religious, and racial backgrounds who can benefit from a rigorous academic program led by a highly qualified and enthusiastic faculty." At the time, however, the school's students were all white.

The college-preparatory school opened on a property that formerly belonged to Harvey W. Cabaniss Sr. It consisted of a Colonial Revival home and a red barn located on Prince and Hawthorne Avenues. The school then moved to a property donated by J. Swanton Ivy.

Athens Academy was headed by Ronald Griffeth and D. Alvin Cash before J. Robert Chambers became headmaster in 1983, followed by John Thorsen in 2014. The school celebrated its 50th anniversary in September 2017.

== Academics and administration ==
The Athens Academy curriculum provides general college-preparatory and honors programs. The College Board's Advanced Placement program is offered as an outgrowth of the Academy's honors program. Art, music, physical education, and drama classes are offered in addition to traditional academic disciplines. The school also offers several studio art classes along with digital art and animation, drawing and painting courses. As of 2008, 21% of graduating seniors were National Merit Scholarship winners.

Athens Academy is made up of four divisions: Preschool, Lower School, Middle School, and Upper School. It is led by a headmaster who reports to the Athens Academy Board of Trustees. Until his retirement following the 2012–2013 school year, Chambers served as headmaster of the school for more than 30 years. He was succeeded by John Thorsen who became Athens Academy's fifth headmaster on July 1, 2014. Beth Sanders is chair of the board of trustees; Susan Zalac is director of the Upper School; Jeff Stachura serves as director of the Middle School; Mark Cunningham is the director of the Lower School; Colleen Burwell is the director of the Preschool.

== Campus ==
The Athens Academy campus is located in Athens, Georgia. J. Swanton Ivy originally donated to the school 105 acres (42.5 hectares) of land just inside Oconee County. As the school continued to grow, it expanded to the surrounding area.

The campus has 24 buildings over 152 acres (61.5 hectares) located off U.S. Route 441. The Chambers Center, a new administration building named after the former headmaster, was the latest building to be inaugurated in September 2017.

== Athletics ==
Athens Academy competes in region 8-AA of the Georgia High School Association (GHSA). They field teams in cross country, football, competitive swimming and diving, golf, track and field, basketball, volleyball, soccer, tennis, cheerleading, wrestling, and baseball. The team name is the Spartans. In grades 7–12, 78% of students participate in athletics.

== Notable alumni ==
- Graham Blanks, 2024 Olympian (5000m) and 2x NCAA Cross Country champion at Harvard
- Amy Bruckner, actress
- Houston Gaines, Georgia State Representative (2019–present)
- Jake Garcia, (Class of 2023), NASCAR Craftsman Truck Series driver
- Vicki Goetze-Ackerman, LPGA Tour golfer
- Elizabeth Guess, soccer player
- Brian Kemp, Governor of Georgia (2019-present) attended through ninth grade
- Lauren Schacher, actress
- Keith Wiggans, soccer player
- Joe Tereshinski III, American football quarterback and college football coach
