= Braxton Pope =

American film and television producer

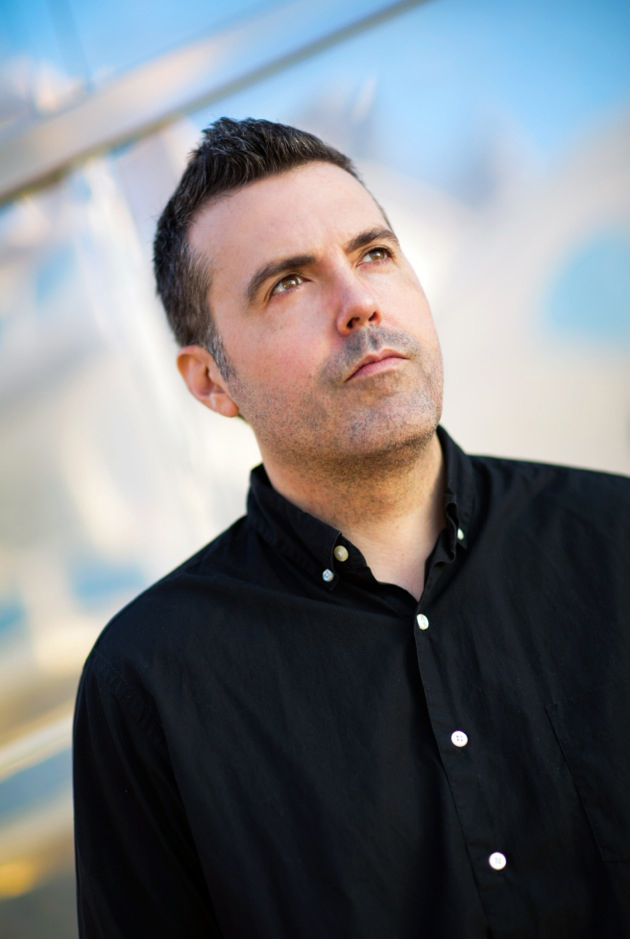
Braxton Pope

Braxton Pope is an independent American film and television producer and writer. He is a partner in Sodium Fox Productions, which he co-founded with novelist Bret Easton Ellis.

== Production work ==
Pope formerly maintained a production deal with Lionsgate. In 2012 he commenced production on a neo-noir feature The Canyons written by Bret Easton Ellis, directed by Paul Schrader and starring Lindsay Lohan that was funded in part by a successful Kickstarter campaign as well as by Pope, Schrader and Ellis individually. The film received media coverage for the innovative way it was financed and produced, utilizing new media techniques including crowdfunding, online casting and social media sites including Twitter and Facebook. The film also received attention for the casting of lead actress Lindsay Lohan who had been acting infrequently in the preceding years as well as adult film performer James Deen in his first mainstream role. Pope also produced Shrink (film) starring Kevin Spacey which premiered at the Sundance Film Festival; the science fiction feature Hirokin starring Wes Bentley, Jessica Szohr, Angus Macfadyen, Julian Sands, and Laura Ramsey; The Take (2008 film) which was directed by Brad Furman and released theatrically by Sony Pictures Entertainment after premiering at the Toronto International Film Festival and receiving a nomination for an Independent Spirit Award. The cast included John Leguizamo, Tyrese Gibson, Rosie Perez and Bobby Cannavale. He also produced the SXSW selection The Bondage starring Michael Angarano, Griffin Dunne and Andy Dick as well as Penny Dreadful (film) and the MGM film Hit and Run (2009 film). In the summer of 2012 he produced the music video Constant Conversations for electropop band Passion Pit that featured Peter Bogdanovich and premiered on Pitchfork.

He executive produced Pete Smalls is Dead starring Tim Roth, Steve Buscemi and Peter Dinklage which domestically premiered at Slamdance after being selected by the International Rome Film Festival and the feature film Life is Hot in Cracktown, written and directed by Buddy Giovinazzo and which starred Kerry Washington, Evan Ross, RZA and Shannyn Sossamon.

He developed the memoir Amarillo Slim with Nicolas Cage and had the original option on the Vanity Fair article "The Suspects Wore Louboutins" by Nancy Jo Sales which was then acquired by Sofia Coppola for her film about the Hollywood Bling Ring. He produced The Golden Suicides which was developed with Gus Van Sant and based on a Vanity Fair article by Sales. He has also developed projects with Gaspar Noe and from source material by Sarah Silverman, Jonathan Ames, Will Self, Denis Johnson and Thom Jones. He was a producer on the documentary Dirty Hands: The Art and Crimes of David Choe and executive produced the feature documentary The Source which premiered in competition at SXSW in 2012. In television he executive produced the Showtime (TV channel) pilots What’s Not To Love which starred Jonathan Ames and Hedonism and a Lionsgate/FX (TV channel) comedy pilot Sweat Shop.

== Life and career ==
Pope received his B.A. from Cornell University where he received a scholarship from Telluride Association and was the recipient of the Cornell Book Award. He was selected by The Hollywood Reporter for their Next Generation issue's “35 under 35.” Pope is a member of the Producers Guild of America and Film Independent, and a board member of Cornell in Hollywood. He has written about film for Paste Magazine and was also the author of a pseudonymous entertainment column for the online literary site of McSweeneys Quarterly.
