= Graham Blanks =

American runner (born 2002)

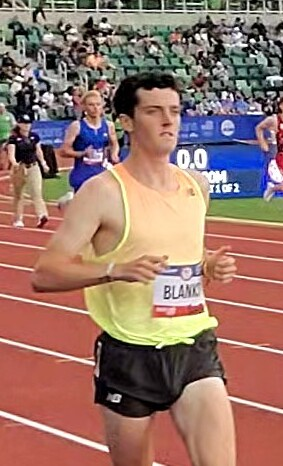
- Blanks in 2024

Personal information
- Nationality: American
- Born: April 24, 2002 (age 24)
- Home town: Athens, Georgia
- Education: Athens Academy; Harvard University
- Height: 5 ft 11 in (180 cm)

Sport
- Sport: Athletics
- Event: Long-distance running
- College team: Harvard Crimson

Graham Blanks (born April 24, 2002) is an American long-distance runner. A two-time NCAA champion and Olympian, Blanks ran in the men's 5000m at the 2024 Olympics, finishing in 9th place in the final with a time of 13:18.67.

== High school career ==
Blanks attended Athens Academy in Athens, Georgia. In addition to running Blanks also played soccer, co-founded the environmental club, and was a part of Model UN. In cross country, he was a four-time All-State honoree, and a two-time 1A private state champion. In track, he was a three-time All-State honoree and the 2019 GHSA 3200 state champion.

== NCAA career ==
As a sophomore at Harvard, Blanks finished 6th at the 2022 NCAA Division I Cross Country Championships. In spring 2023, he won the Ivy League titles in the indoor mile and 3000 meters, as well as in the outdoor 5000 meters. He capped off the season with a second-place finish in the 5000 meters and sixth place in the 10,000 meters at the NCAA Division I Outdoor Track and Field Championships. He won the 2023 NCAA Division I Cross Country Championships in November 2023, making him the first male runner from an Ivy League school to win the race. Two weeks later, he set the collegiate record for the indoor 5000 meters, running 13:03.78 in Boston.

At the end of 2023, Blanks signed an NIL deal with New Balance.

On July 7, 2024, Blanks qualified for the 2024 Summer Olympics in the men's 5000-meter run. Although he placed fourth at the U.S. Olympic trials with a time of 13:12.61, the third-place finisher had not met the Olympic cutoff time of 13:05.00. Blanks competed in the Olympic 5000m, and in the final finished 9th with a time of 13:18.67.

On November 23, 2024, Blanks won his second consecutive NCAA Division I Cross Country Championship, becoming the 13th men's athlete in NCAA history to do so.

On December 7, 2024, in Boston, he broke the 13 minute barrier in the indoor 5000 meters, running 12:59.89. This time placed him as second all-time on the NCAA list. Two days later, he announced that he would forego the rest of his NCAA eligibility, and signed a professional contract with New Balance.

On June 12, 2025, at the Bislett Games, Blanks ran a personal best of 12:48.20 in the 5000 meters. In April 2026, Blanks competed in the Twilight magic mile in Athens GA, and ran a 4:04.[14]

== Professional career ==
=== Circuit performances ===
Grand Slam Track results
Slam	Race group	Event	Pl.	Time	Prize money
2025 Philadelphia Slam	Long distance	3000 m	5th	8:03.22	US$10,000

== Personal bests ==
Outdoor

- 1500 metres – 3:44.08 (New York 2021)
- 5000 metres – 12:47.98 (2026 Brussels Diamond League)
- 10,000 metres – 26:57.30 (San Juan Capistrano 2025)

Indoor

- 1500 metres – 3:36.11 (Boston 2025)
- Mile – 3:56.63 (Boston 2023)
- 3000 metres – 7:29.72 (Boston 2025)
- 5000 metres – 12:59.89 (Boston 2024)
