= Leslie Coutterand =

French actress, model and filmmaker

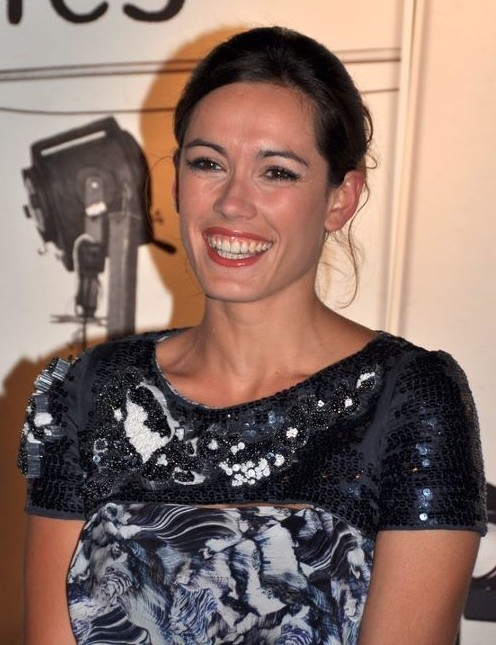
- Coutterand in 2012.
- Born: October 20, 1984 (age 41); Chamonix, France
- Occupations: Actress, model, documentarian
- Notable work: Julie Lescaut (TV series), I Love Therefore I Am (documentary)

Leslie Coutterand (born October 1984) is a French actress, model, writer, director and documentary filmmaker from Chamonix, France. Before graduating the drama college at Cours Florent in 2008, she was cast as Alexandra in the television series Deja Vu which filmed in Vietnam and Singapore. A series of TV and film roles followed, and then in 2011 she was cast as a series regular in the French police drama, Julie Lescaut as Mado. In 2013, she was cast alongside Stanley Tucci, Marcia Gay Harden, Taye Diggs, and Rebecca Romijn in the film Larry Gaye: Renegade Male Flight Attendant.

Coutterand is also a model and has been featured in high-profile and international campaigns for clients including Nivea, Head and Shoulders, Joes Jeans and Louis Vuitton. In 2015 she was cast as the lead model in a nine-minute-long commercial for Persol Sunglasses directed by Bret Easton Ellis.

In 2016, she and creative partner Marine Billet began filming their documentary I Love Therefore I Am. She spoke about the film, which is a global investigation into the concept of love and its impact on the world, at the TED conference in Lyon France in December 2016.

== Highlighted acting credits ==
Year	Title	Role
2007-09	Déjà vu	Alexandra
2010	One Husband To Many	Pigiste n°1
2011-13	Julie Lescaut	Mado
2014	Next Time on Lonny	Emily, "The Lonny Experiment"
2015	Larry Gaye: Renegade Male Flight Attendant	Isabella
2016	Dehors, tu vas avoir si froid	Leslie Camila-Rose
2017	Burning Dog	Sarah
