= Branden Dozier =

American gridiron football player (born 1993)

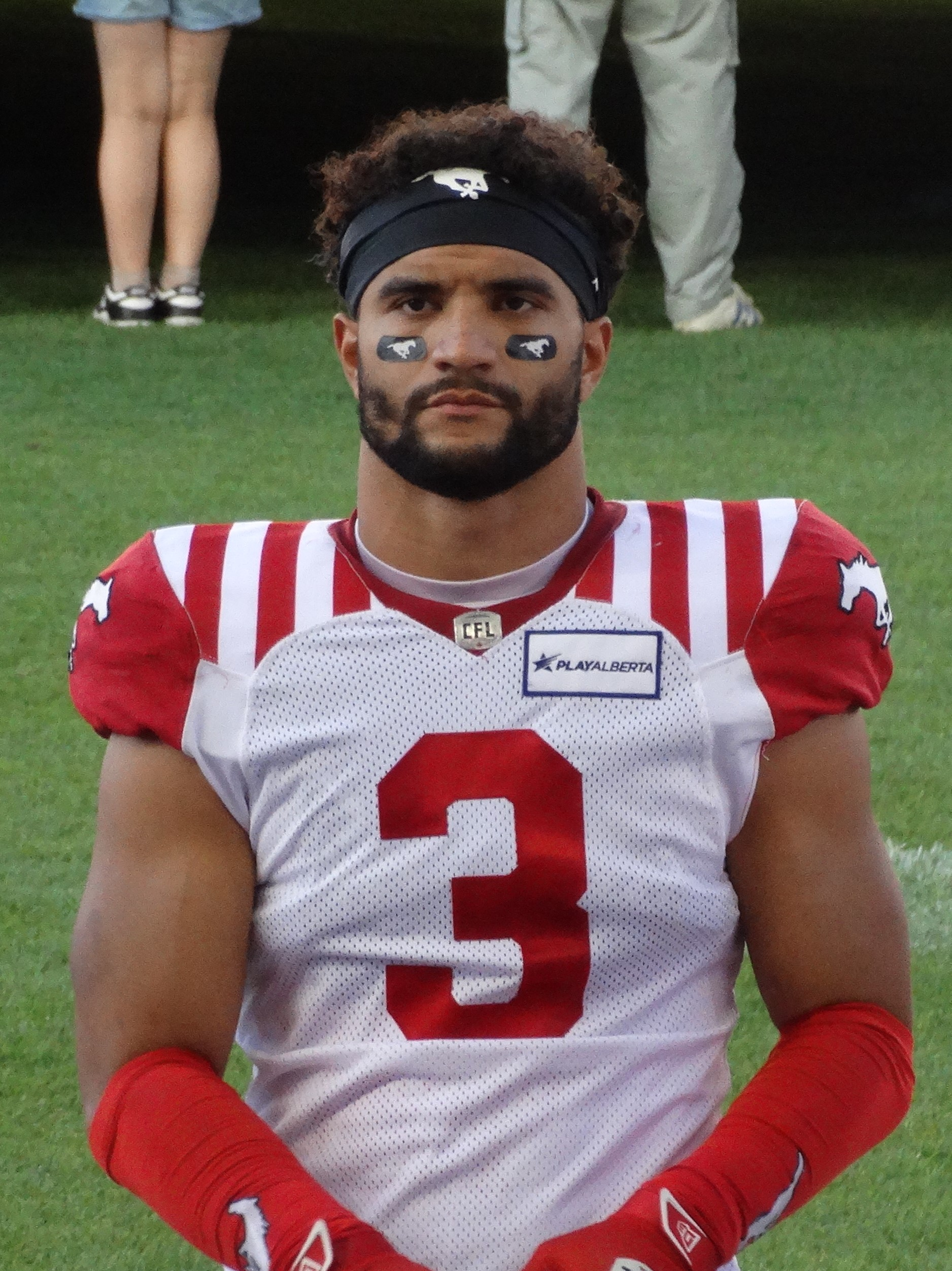
- Dozier with the Calgary Stampeders in 2024

Profile
- Position: Defensive back

Personal information
- Born: November 28, 1993 (age 32); Topeka, Kansas, U.S.
- Listed height: 5 ft 11 in (1.80 m)
- Listed weight: 201 lb (91 kg)

Career information
- College: Charlotte

Career history
- 2017–2018: Montreal Alouettes
- 2019: BC Lions
- 2020–2024: Calgary Stampeders
- 2025: Hamilton Tiger-Cats
- 2025: Toronto Argonauts

Awards and highlights
- CFL East All-Star (2018)
- Stats at CFL.ca

Branden Dozier (born November 28, 1993) is an American professional football defensive back. He most recently played for the Toronto Argonauts of the Canadian Football League (CFL). He played college football with the UNC-Charlotte 49ers.

== Early life and college ==
Dozier played running back and defensive back at Washburn Rural High School, where he earned All-City honors before graduating in 2012. He then played at Butler County Community College, where he garnered all-Kansas Jayhawk honors as a defensive back. While at UNC Charlotte, he set a single-season tackle record.

== Professional career ==
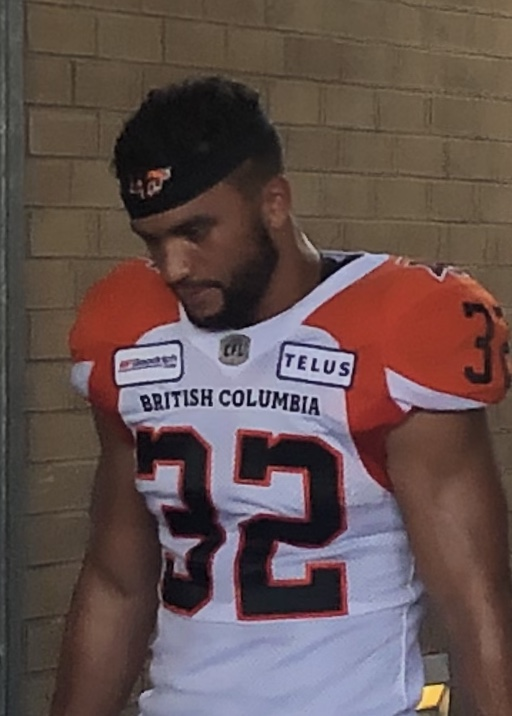
Dozier with the BC Lions in 2019

Dozier attended a Pittsburgh Steelers rookie mini-camp in 2016 but was not offered a contract.

=== Montreal Alouettes ===
After sitting out a year to complete his studies, he reached out to a member of the Montreal Alouettes front office, did a private workout, and was promptly signed to his first pro contract. For the 2017 CFL season, Dozier recorded 60 defensive tackles, including two sacks, as well as 14 special teams tackles. He also scored a touchdown on a 20-yard fumble return. He was the team's nominee for the league's Most Outstanding Rookie award. In 2018, he played in 17 games while recording 84 defensive tackles, 18 special teams tackles, and five interceptions en route to being named a 2018 CFL Eastern All-Star at safety. He was released by the Alouettes on May 13, 2019.

=== BC Lions ===
Dozier signed with the BC Lions on June 25, 2019. He played in 16 regular season games where he had 70 defensive tackles, seven special teams tackles, one interception, and one forced fumble.

=== Calgary Stampeders ===
As a free agent, he signed with Calgary Stampeders on February 11, 2020. After the CFL canceled the 2020 season due to the COVID-19 pandemic, Dozier chose to opt-out of his contract with the Stampeders on September 3, 2020. Despite opting out, he was technically still under contract with the Stampeders and signed an extension to remain with the club on February 2, 2021.

On February 4, 2024, the Stampeders announced that Dozier had signed a contract extension with the team. He played in 14 regular season games in 2024 where he had 51 defensive tackles and three special teams tackles. He became a free agent upon the expiry of his contract on February 11, 2025.

=== Hamilton Tiger-Cats ===
On April 24, 2025, it was announced that Dozier had signed with the Hamilton Tiger-Cats. He played in the first four regular season games for the Tiger-Cats in 2025 where he had 13 defensive tackles and one special teams tackle before being moved to the injured list. He was later released on August 5, 2025.

=== Toronto Argonauts ===
On August 11, 2025, it was announced that Dozier had signed with the Toronto Argonauts. He played in the last nine games of the regular season where he had 32 defensive tackles, four special teams tackles, and five sacks. As a pending free agent, he was released in the following offseason on January 19, 2026.
