= Me&John =

Canadian composing duo

- Genres: Hip-hop, indie, dance, folk, pop
- Years active: 2002–present
- Labels: Various
- Members: Ryan Kondrat, John La Magna
- Website: www.facebook.com/meandjohncan

Me&John is a record production, engineering, mixing, and songwriting duo based in Toronto, Ontario, Canada. The duo is composed of Ryan Kondrat and John La Magna. The two have created music from a myriad of genres, ranging from dance, hip-hop, folk, and pop.

The two met at school in 2002. They began their career in the dance music scene as ghost writers for Jelo, Donald Glaude, and DJ Dan. They soon merged into the television and advertising side of the music industry working for Syndicate Sound in Toronto. At Syndicate Sound they were able to write music in a fully equipped professional studio, leveraging writing skills for studio time, they Produced and co-wrote Broken Social Scene presents Brendan Canning while simultaneously composing scores for Television and Film. Their next record With Shad, landed them a Polaris Prize shortlisting and a Juno for Hip Hop recording of the year. The two are currently Music Directors/Composers for Grayson Matthews in Toronto .

Me&John have recently produced an Album for Lily Frost, Scored and Produced the soundtrack for Paul Schrider's, The Canyons, with Brendan Canning, and just finished a New Documentary for Sony and Gran Turismo, KAZ: Pushing the Virtual Divide, that took home a gold, at London International in 2015.

== Album / Contributions ==
Artist	Record	Role	Label	Year
Aviva	Songs about boys	Co-writers/Producers/Artists	Cardinal Point	2017
Brendan Canning with me&john	The Canyons	Co-writers/Producers/Artists	SQE	2012
Lily Frost	Do What you Love	Album Producers / Track Co-writes	Aporia	2012
Shad	TSOL (album)	Album Producers / Track Co-writes / Recording Engineers	Black Box	2010 Juno Award for Rap Recording of the Year
Broken Social Scene Presents: Brendan Canning	Something For All Of Us	Co-writers/Producers	Arts & Crafts	2008

== Feature Length Contributions ==
The Canyons		Co-writers/Composers	2012
Kaz Pushing the virtual divide	Sony	Composers	2013/14

== Television Contributions ==
Show	Seasons	Network	Role	Year
Style Factory	2	Syndicated	Composer / Music Director	2016-17
BackStage	2	Syndicated	Composer	2016-17
Ice Road Truckers	10,11	Syndicated	Composer / Music Director	2016-17
Property Brothers	7,8,9	Syndicated	Composer / Music Director	2016-17
The Goods	1	CBC	Composer / Theme	2016
Apres Ski	1	Bravo US	Composer / Music Director	2014–2015
Frozen Gold	1	Slice	Music Director	2014–2015
Dino Hunters Canada	1	History	Music Director	2014–2015
Fear Thy Neighbor	1,2,3	Discovery	Composer (Theme) /Music Director	2013–2014
Property Brothers	4,5,6	Syndicated	Composer/Music Director	2013–2014
Property Brothers Buy & Sell	3,4,5	Syndicated	Composer/Music Director	2013–2014
Carnival Eats	1,2 & 3	food	Composer	2012–2016
Motives and Murders	1	Discovery	Composer (Background) /Music Director	2013–2014
Murder in Paradise	1	Discovery	Composer (Background) /Music Director	2013–2014
Life Story Project	1	OWN	Composer/Music Director	2012–2013
Husband Hunters	1	OWN	Composer/Music Director	2012–2013
Backyard Inventors	1	OWN	Composer/Music Director	2012–2013
Project Runway Canada	1 & 2	Global/Slice	Composer/Producers	2007–2008 (Gemini Nominated)
Make The Politician Work	1	CBC	Composer/Producers/Engineers	2011 (Gemini Nominated)
Are We There Yet	3	Syndicated	Composer	2010
Keys to the VIP	1,2,3,	CTV/Comedy	Composer/Producers/Engineers	2006–2009
Star Racer	1	Discovery	Composer	2006
Nerve	1	CBC	Composer/Producers	2009
SmartAsk	1	CBC	Composer/Producers	2001–2004
Space for Living	1	Syndicated	Composer/Producers	2008
City Chasers	1	Discovery	Composer/Producers/Engineers	2010
5 Seekers	1	Syndicated	Composer/Producers/Engineers	2008
Guides & Gurus	1	Syndicated	Composer/Producers/Engineers	2008
