= Jeff Mullen =

American football player and coach (born 1968)

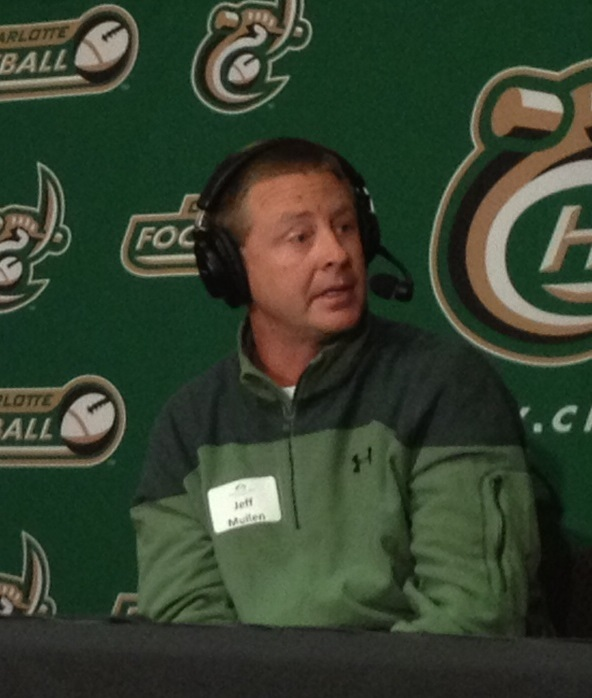

Biographical details
- Born: September 15, 1968 (age 58); Lima, Ohio, U.S.

Playing career
- 1986–1989: Wittenberg
- Position: Defensive back

Coaching career (HC unless noted)
- 1990: Hamilton Township HS (OH) (assistant)
- 1991: Hawaiʻi (GA)
- 1992–1993: Ohio (GA)
- 1995–1996: Ohio (FB)
- 1997–2000: Ohio (TE/OT)
- 2001–2002: Wake Forest (OT)
- 2003–2007: Wake Forest (QB)
- 2008–2010: West Virginia (OC/QB)
- 2011–2017: Charlotte (OC)
- 2017: Charlotte (QB)

Jeff Mullen (born September 15, 1968) is an American football coach. He is the former quarterback coach of the Charlotte 49ers. Mullen was previously an assistant coach at Ohio University, Wake Forest University, and West Virginia University.

== Early life ==
Mullen attended Wittenberg University in Ohio, where he was a four-year letterwinner and a 1989 All-American selection at defensive back.

Mullen received his bachelor's degree in sociology from Wittenberg in 1990 and a master's degree in athletic administration from Ohio University in 1993.

Mullen began his coaching career at Hamilton Township High School in Ohio in 1990 where he coached under Mark Hundley. He then served as a defensive graduate assistant for the University of Hawaiʻi in 1991.

== Coaching career ==
=== Ohio University ===
After leaving Hawaiʻi, Mullen moved to Ohio University in 1992 as an offensive graduate assistant. He spent two seasons as a graduate assistant, then moved to video coordinator and administrative assistant in 1994. In December of the same year, Mullen became the fullbacks coach under new head coach Jim Grobe's arrival.

In 1996, Mullen moved to tight ends and offensive tackles under Grobe.

=== Wake Forest ===
Following his nine seasons at Ohio, Mullen followed head coach Jim Grobe to Wake Forest University with most of the staff from Ohio.

In 2001 and 2002, Mullen coached tackles Tim Bennett and Mark Moroz. Moroz earned honorable mention for the All-ACC team. He also coached tight end Ray Thomas and fullback Ovie Mughelli, both whom played professional football. Mughelli was a fourth round NFL draft selection after rushing for 12 touchdowns, the most in 30 years in school history.

In 2003, Mullen moved to coach the quarterbacks under Grobe. Mullen coached some of the greatest quarterbacks in school history, including Cory Randolph, Ben Mauk, and Riley Skinner. Randolph finished as the 10th leading passer in school history, and the third most accurate. Mauk started six games and led the Deacons in passing yards in 2005, before being injured and transferring to the University of Cincinnati during the 2006 season. Skinner took over for Mauk in 2006, and led the team in passing in 2007 with 2,204 yards and 12 touchdowns. He also set the Atlantic Coast Conference (ACC) single-season completion percentage record in 2007.

=== West Virginia ===
On February 19, 2008, Mullen was announced the new offensive coordinator and quarterbacks coach under new head coach Bill Stewart at West Virginia University.

During his time at West Virginia he coached Pat White in 2008. A second-round NFL draft pick, White, who was a senior, led West Virginia University to the Meineke Car Care Bowl, becoming the first starting quarterback in NCAA history to win four bowl games. Mullen also recruited and coached Geno Smith at West Virginia University. In 2010, with Smith at quarterback, Mullen helped West Virginia to the Co-Big East Championship with an offense that ranked #2 in total offense, #4 in rushing offense and #2 in passing offense in the conference. Smith was the 39th overall pick, going in the second round of the 2013 NFL draft.

=== Charlotte ===
On March 1, 2011, Mullen was announced as the new offensive coordinator for the Charlotte 49ers, who began play in 2013.

In their first two playing seasons, the 49ers averaged 468 yards of total offense and produced the 49ers first 1,000 yard rusher (Kalif Phillips, 1,441 yards) and receiver (Austin Duke, 1,373 yards) as well as a 2013 Jerry Rice Award Finalist for the FCS Top First-Year Player Award (QB Matt Johnson).

In their first season, the 49ers uptempo attack ranked in the nation's top 30 in total offense (448.5 yds; 20th), rushing offense (206.8 yds; 26th) and scoring offense (33.4 pts; 27th). Charlotte put up over 500 yards of offense five times. Four of those 500+ games came against FCS scholarship programs, including 501 at #3/#6 ranked Coastal Carolina. The 49ers put up at least 45 points and 450 yards in each of their five wins, scored over 50 points three times and put up 500 or more yards five times. The offense ran 75.2 plays per game with a high of 106 vs. N.C. Central. The 49ers had 18 touchdown drives that took under 1:30 and six one-play touchdown drives.

In year two, the 49ers averaged 487.4 yards of total offense, with 222 yards rushing and 265 yards passing on their way to 38.9 points per game. The 49ers had 22 TD drives of 1:30 or less and seven one-play touchdown drives. Nineteen TD's were on plays of 50 or more yards.

Charlotte has established records of 61 points; 439 rushing yards; 381 passing yards and 684 yards of total offense.
