= Joe Tereshinski III =

American football player and coach (born 1983)

Current position
- Title: Quarterback

Biographical details
- Born: July 23, 1983 (age 43); Athens, Georgia, U.S.

Playing career
- 2004–2006: Georgia
- Position: Quarterback

Coaching career (HC unless noted)
- 2010: Wake Forest (GA)
- 2010–2011: Wake Forest (TE)
- 2012–2017: Charlotte (WR/RC)

Joseph Peter Tereshinski III (born July 23, 1983) is an American former football quarterback. He played college football for Georgia. He is a third-generation Georgia Bulldogs football player. After graduating and serving two seasons as an assistant coach at Wake Forest, in January 2012, Tereshinski was hired as the inside receivers coach and recruiting coordinator at Charlotte. His last season with the 49ers program was 2017.

== Early life ==
Tereshinski attended Athens Academy, a private school in Georgia, where he led the Spartans for his sophomore, junior, and senior seasons. Tereshinski threw for 2,100 yards and 17 touchdowns in his senior year at Athens (Georgia) Academy in 2001, and was heavily recruited by Harvard University.

== College career ==
Tereshinski played in six games during UGA's 2005 season. He played the entire game against Florida, which the Bulldogs narrowly lost. Tereshinski completed eight of 21 passes for 100 yards, with an interception, and he scored Georgia's only touchdown in the 14–10 defeat, catching a touchdown pass from tailback Thomas Brown. Starter D.J. Shockley returned the following week from an MCL sprain, and Tereshinski was not seen again until Georgia's SEC Eastern Division-clinching win over Kentucky, in which he threw his first career touchdown pass, a 27-yarder to A.J. Bryant.

Tereshinski was the starting quarterback until injuring his ankle in the second game of the season. He was replaced by freshman Matthew Stafford. After the fifth game of the season, Georgia coach Mark Richt said that Tereshinski's ankle had healed and that he would again be the starting quarterback for Georgia's sixth game, against Tennessee. Tereshinski led the offense to a considerable lead going into halftime, but after a disastrous second half, Georgia suffered a 51–33 loss to Tennessee. Tereshinski started again the next week, against Vanderbilt, and the entire Georgia offense was once again lackluster in a 24–22 loss. After the game, Richt benched Tereshinski in favor of Stafford.

== Coaching career ==
After graduating in 2007, Tereshinski embarked on a career as a consultant in the finance industry in Atlanta. In 2010, he enrolled at Wake Forest University to serve as a graduate assistant under defensive coordinator Brad Lambert. In 2011, he was promoted to tight ends coach. On January 4, 2012, Tereshinski accepted the receivers coaching position at Charlotte also under Lambert.

== Family ==
In 2005, Joe Tereshinski III became the fourth Tereshinski to play for the University of Georgia's football team, as well as the fourth to win a Southeastern Conference Championship there. Tereshinski's grandfather, Joe Tereshinski, Sr. (a tight end), played for the 1942 and 1946 SEC and National Championship teams. His father, Joe Tereshinski, Jr. (a center), and his uncle, Wally Tereshinski (a tight end) both played on the 1976 SEC Championship team. His father has also been the Assistant Strength and Conditioning Coach for the Bulldogs since 1982. His younger brother, John (a tight end), played football for Wake Forest University.
