= Lauren Schacher =

American filmmaker

- Born: August 2, 1985 (age 41); Seattle, Washington US
- Education: McGill University, Montreal, CA
- Occupations: Filmmaker, screenwriter, podcaster, actress
- Years active: 2006 – present
- Known for: The Canyons
- Website: www.laurenschacher.com

Lauren Schacher (born August 2, 1985) is an American actor, screenwriter, and director most known for her role in Paul Schrader's The Canyons and as a co-founder of podcast Chicks Who Script.

== Early life ==
Schacher was born in Seattle, Washington and raised in Athens, Georgia. She studied biochemistry and Italian Literature at McGill University and theater acting at the Neighborhood Playhouse.

== Career ==
Schacher moved to New York City where she attended The Neighborhood Playhouse School of the Theatre to pursue an acting career, appearing in a handful of plays and independent films, including a production of Alan Ball's Five Women Wearing Dresses. In 2013, after an online search through Mobli, Schacher was cast as Caitlin in Paul Schrader's film The Canyons starring Lindsay Lohan and James Deen as well at HBO's TV Movie Phil Spector, directed by David Mamet and starring Al Pacino, Helen Mirren and Jeffrey Tambor. In 2013 Schacher was included in Backstage's 2nd annual "30 Actors to Watch" list.

Schacher, alongside writers Jenna Laurenzo and Amy Staats, won the inaugural Big Vision Empty Wallet Fellowship. In 2014, Schacher co-founded the Chicks Who Script podcast with writers Emily Blake and Maggie Levin to discuss primarily female filmmakers and the films, web series, and TV shows they make. The show recorded 94 episodes with guests including Rose McGowan, Nicole Perlman, Franklin Leonard, LaToya Morgan, Karyn Kusama and Brian Koppelman. In 2016, she co-created the viral webseries F*ck Yes alongside Emily Best, Erica Anderson, Eve Cohen, Blessing Yen, Jessica King, and Julie Keck.
