= CRI =

CRI or CRi may refer to:

== Organizations ==
- Canadian Rivers Institute, for river sciences, University of New Brunswick
- Cancer Research Institute, New York, US
- Centro de Relaciones Internacionales (International Relations Center), Universidad Nacional Autónoma de México
- Crime Reduction Initiatives, later Change, Grow, Live, England and Wales
- Charlotte Research Institute, a technology-focused partnership, US
- China Radio International
- Christian Research Institute, Charlotte, North Carolina, US
- Community Rowing, Inc., Boston, Massachusetts, US
- Croce Rossa Italiana, the Italian Red Cross
- Crown Research Institutes, New Zealand
- Centre for Research and Information, think-tank and research cell of the Awami League.

=== Businesses ===
- CRI Middleware, a Japanese software developer
- Carbon Recycling International, Iceland
- Composers Recordings, Inc., a former US record label
- Computer Resources International, a Danish aerospace company

== Places ==
- Costa Rica, ISO 3166-1 code

== Buildings ==
- Cardiff Royal Infirmary, Wales
- Cricklewood railway station, London, England, station code

== Science and technology ==
- Color rendering index, of a light source
- Color Reproduction Index, light measurement parameter for spectral quality as defined by the Commission Internationale de l’Éclairage

== Other uses ==
- Chechen Republic of Ichkeria, a former secessionist government
- CRi, Canadian electronic musician

== See also ==
- Cri Cri (disambiguation)
- Cry
