= Jerry Richardson Stadium =

College football stadium in Charlotte, North Carolina, United States

McColl–Richardson Field at Jerry Richardson Stadium
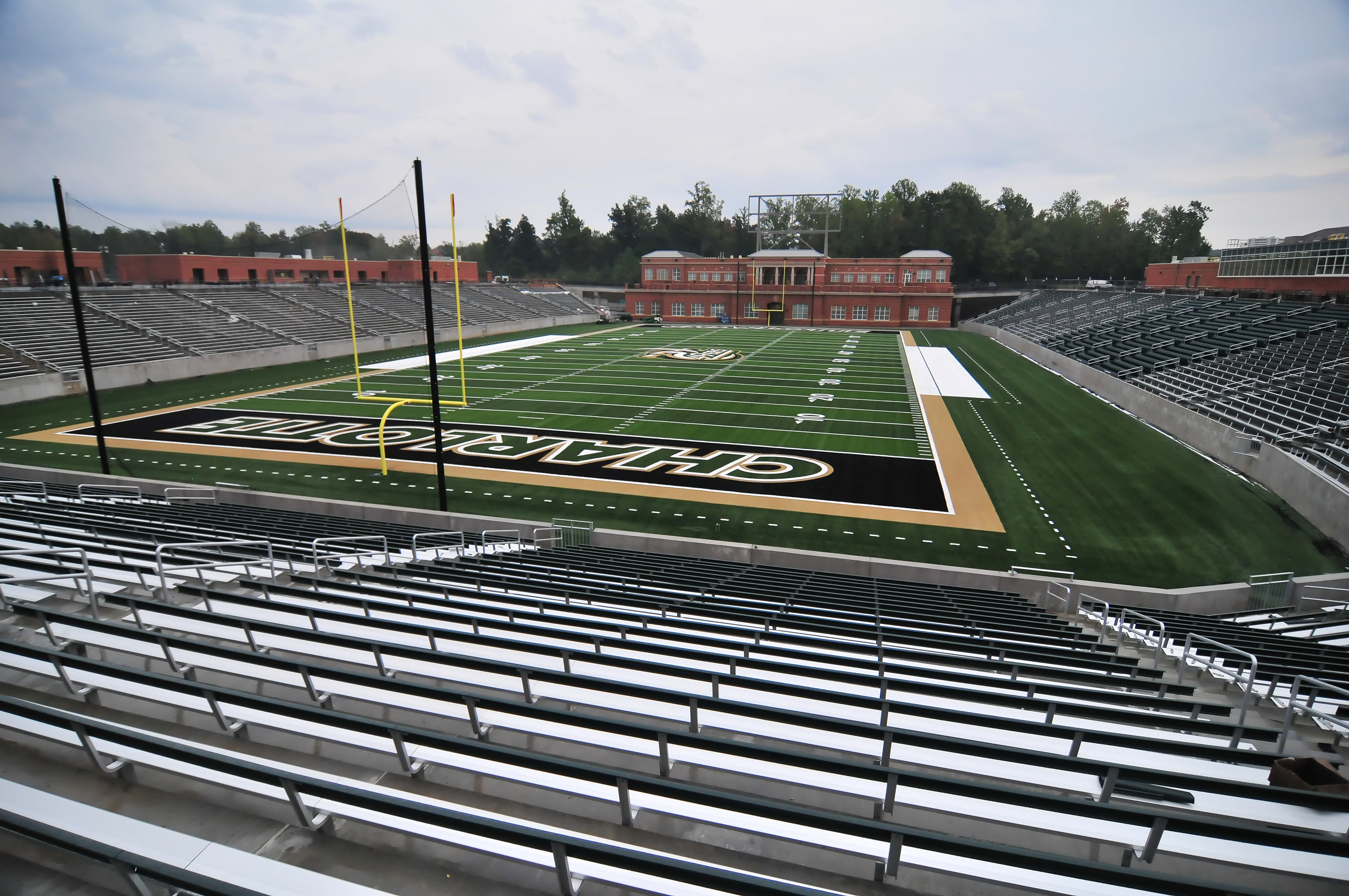
- Jerry Richardson Stadium

- Location in North Carolina Location in the United States
- Location: Charlotte, North Carolina, U.S.
- Coordinates: 35°18′38″N 80°44′25″W
- Owner: University of North Carolina at Charlotte
- Capacity: 15,314
- Surface: AstroTurf's RootZone 3D3 Blend
- Scoreboard: Panasonic 70 ft × 28 ft (21.3 m × 8.5 m)
- Record attendance: 19,233; September 6, 2025 Charlotte 49ers vs. North Carolina Tar Heels
- Field size: 360 by 160 feet (110 m × 49 m)
- Acreage: 25 acres (10 ha)
- Public transit: Niner Transit

Construction
- Groundbreaking: April 28, 2011
- Built: 2011–2012
- Opened: August 31, 2013
- Cost: $45 million ($62.2 million in 2025 dollars)
- Architects: DLR Group; Jenkins·Peer Architects
- Structural engineer: SKA Consulting Engineers
- General contractor: Rodgers/PCL/Russell

Tenants
- Charlotte 49ers football (2013–present); Charlotte 49ers Women’s Lacrosse (2025–present)

Website
- www.charlotte49ers.com

McColl–Richardson Field at Jerry Richardson Stadium is a college football stadium in University City, Charlotte, North Carolina, United States and the home field of the Charlotte 49ers football team representing the University of North Carolina at Charlotte (UNC Charlotte). The team became a Football Bowl Subdivision member in 2015 and competes in the American Athletic Conference.

Proposed by the university's chancellor Phillip Dubois in 2008, the stadium's construction was approved by the school's Board of Trustees, the University of North Carolina Board of Governors, and Governor Bev Perdue before officially beginning construction in April 2011. Businessmen Hugh McColl and Jerry Richardson purchased the naming rights to the facility's playing field in 2011, and construction finished in October 2012. The stadium was named for Richardson in 2013 after an additional $10 million donation. The stadium hosted its first major event on August 31, 2013, when the 49ers defeated the Campbell Fighting Camels.

Designed by Jenkins·Peer Architects and the DLR Group, the horseshoe-shaped stadium has a capacity of 15,314 people. Much of the current home side seating area is available with the purchase of a personal seat license. The venue includes various amenities, such as the Judy W. Rose football center, which includes athletic and academic facilities. Located on the UNC Charlotte campus, parking is expected to be limited on game days, although public transportation routes to reach the stadium are available.

== History ==
=== Funding ===
In February 2008, a university-appointed committee presented a report to UNC Charlotte Chancellor Phil Dubois recommending the addition of a football program at the school, which would cost approximately $11.5 million per year and would be funded primarily through an annually increasing student athletic fee. In June 2008, Dubois presented a report to the school's Board of Trustees addressing the potential impact of the addition of a football stadium on the university. In the report, Dubois suggested two possible locations for a new stadium: a renovated Irwin Belk Track and Field Center/Transamerica Field or a new facility at the site of recreational fields on the northwestern part of the campus. Dubois preferred the latter for cost reasons. In November 2008, the board unanimously approved Dubois' proposal to add a football program.

On December 11, 2009, the Board of Trustees approved a financing plan for football, which called for the university to borrow $40.5 million in state-issued bonds to construct a permanent football stadium and field house, citing a favorable bidding environment and greater interest in ticket sales as their reasons for building a new facility rather than expanding American Legion Memorial Stadium. On February 12, 2010, the University of North Carolina Board of Governors approved a student fee increase to fund the construction of the facility. Students pay an annual fee of $120 to fund the stadium's construction debt. A separate fee, which will begin at $50 and increase annually until it reaches $200, will pay for regular operating costs. On August 2, 2010, North Carolina Governor Bev Perdue signed the debt service fee bill into law to clear the way for stadium construction. The final design of the new stadium was displayed at the Board of Trustees meeting on September 24, 2010.

=== Initial construction and naming rights ===
Rodgers PCL Russell, a joint venture of Rodgers Builders, PCL Construction, and H. J. Russell & Company, was the primary builder for the stadium and football center. On April 28, 2011, UNC Charlotte held a groundbreaking ceremony for the new football stadium. Construction finished in the fall of 2012, and ownership was turned over to university control on October 31, 2012. That month, the university announced its intent to make the stadium a zero waste facility.

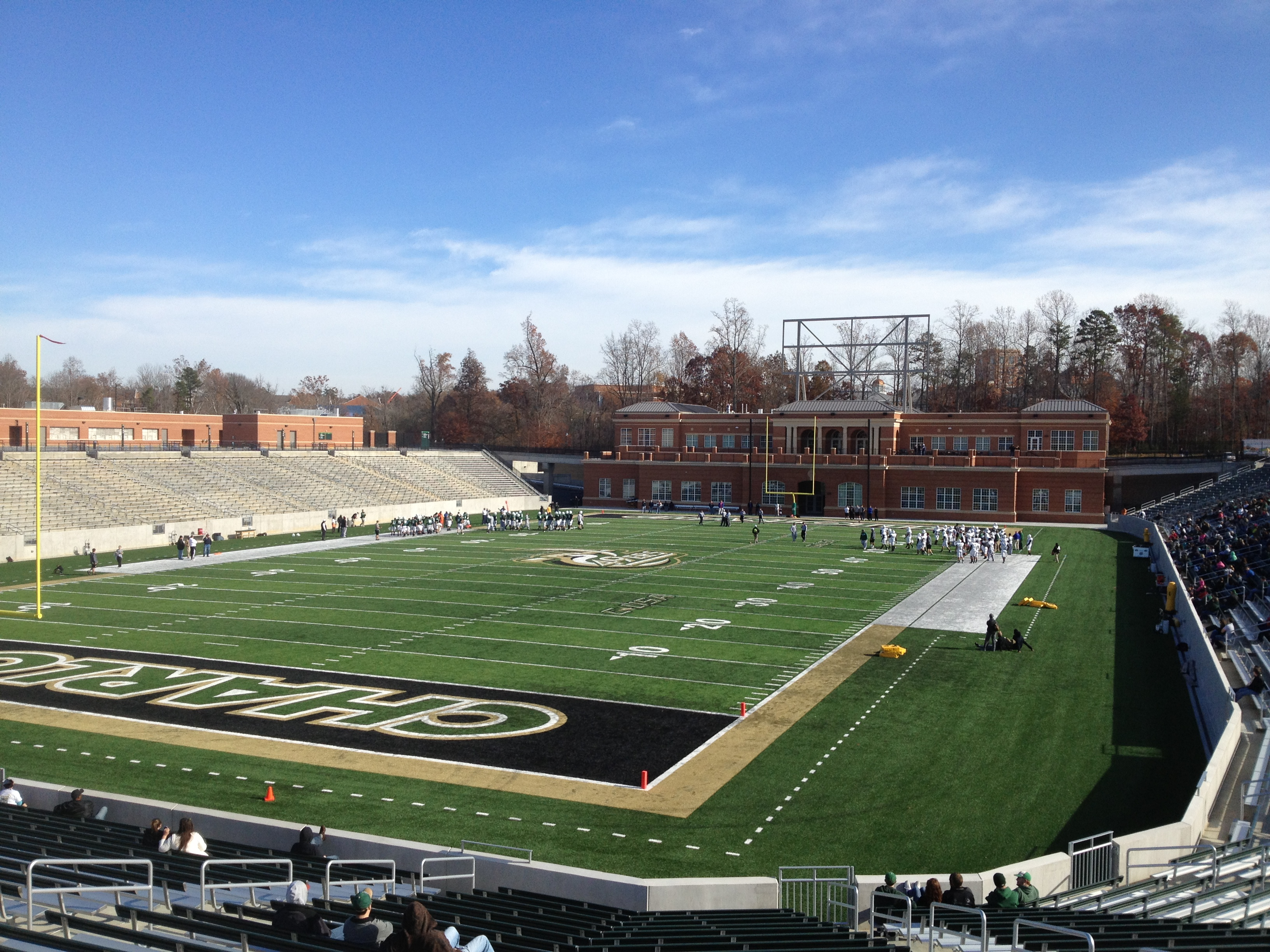
2013 Spring Practice

On November 1, 2011, the stadium's playing field was named McColl–Richardson Field after Hugh McColl, former chief executive officer of Bank of America, and Jerry Richardson, then-owner of the National Football League's Carolina Panthers, purchased the naming rights for an undisclosed amount. Although athletic director Judy Rose stated that the school was asking for $5 million over 13 years for the naming rights to the stadium, the school announced on June 11, 2013, that Richardson had donated an additional $10 million to the school's football program, and the facility would be named Jerry Richardson Stadium. The donation attracted some controversy, due to the fact that Richardson had recently lobbied the City of Charlotte for $87.5 million in public funds to renovate Bank of America Stadium.

=== Opening ===
Four days after the venue passed inspection, the team hosted an informal scrimmage in front of approximately 1,500 spectators on November 3, 2012. Two weeks later, 2,500 attendees watched the team's final scrimmage before its first season in 2013. The inaugural Green and White Spring Game was held on April 20, 2013; the announced attendance at the game was 13,950. The stadium hosted its first major event when the 2013 Charlotte 49ers football team defeated the Campbell Fighting Camels 52–7 on August 31, 2013. The announced official attendance for the game was 16,630, setting an initial standing-room record for the venue. The first intercollegiate points scored at the facility came when linebacker Mark Hogan (who had previously been one of the first members of the Georgia State Panthers football program) returned an interception for a touchdown on the second play from scrimmage. The team's third home game, a 13–40 loss to the North Carolina Central Eagles, also had an announced attendance of 16,630.

=== 2023 Famous Toastery Bowl ===
Due to ongoing renovations at Thomas Robinson Stadium in Nassau, Bahamas, the ninth edition of the Bahamas Bowl was played at Jerry Richardson Stadium on December 18, 2023. Famous Toastery, a Charlotte-based restaurant chain, was the title sponsor of the relocated bowl.

=== Modifications, changes, and upgrades ===
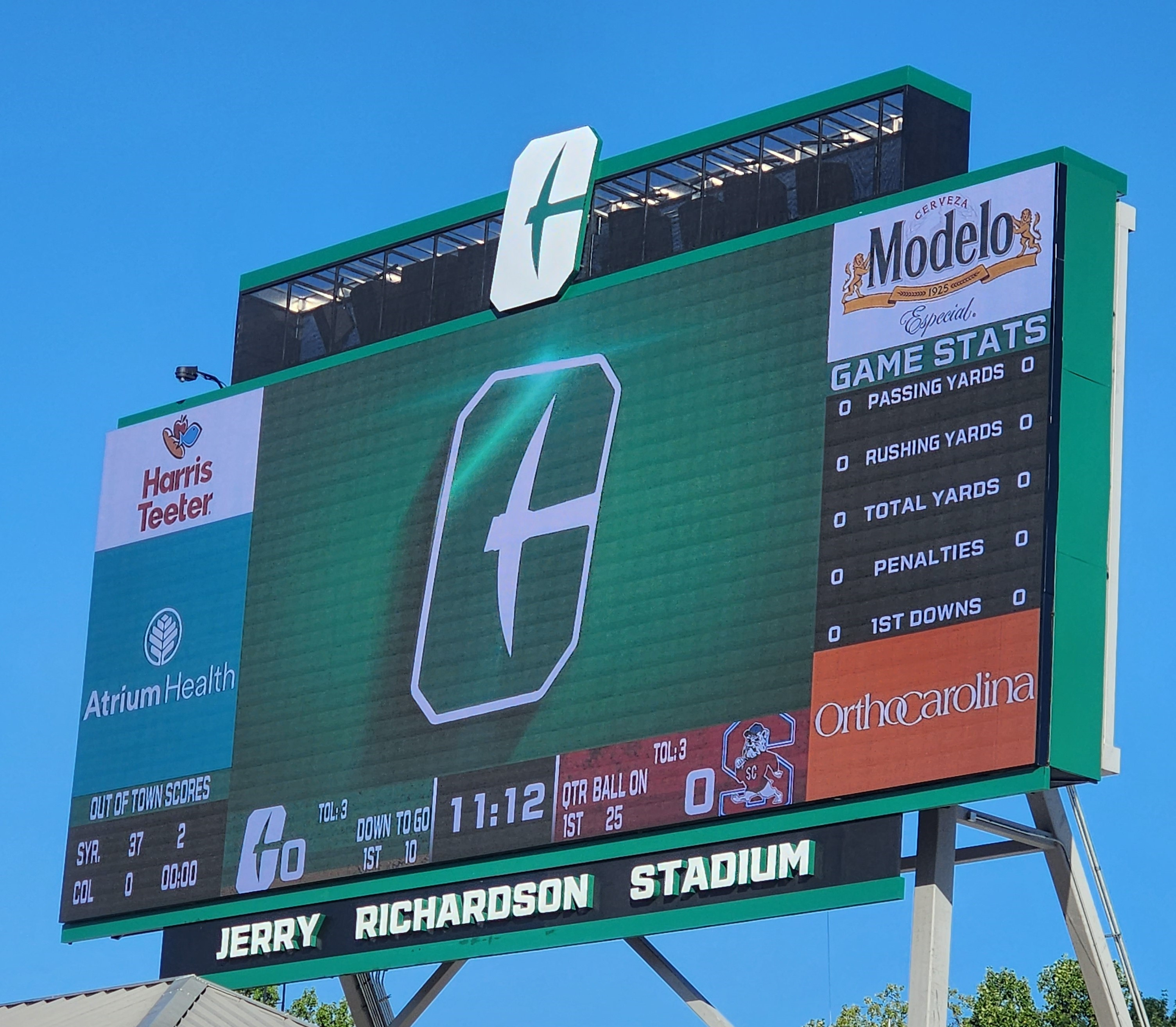
2nd scoreboard installed at Jerry Richardson Stadium

Lighting for night games was installed starting on March 17, 2015. Eight light poles were erected by Qualite Sports Lighting for $1.5 million. On August 28, 2015, the promenade containing the university box, media box, broadcast booths and coaches' boxes was named for alumni Hunter and Stephanie Edwards.

During the summer of 2021, the field turf got its first full replacement. The previously installed Hellas Matrix Synthetic turf was removed and replaced with AstroTurf's RootZone 3D3 Blend and the Brock YSR Shock Pad. This coincided with the rebranding of stadium images with the new logo, first introduced in 2020.

During the summer of 2023 the video score board, video ribbons, and sound systems were all upgraded. The new score board video screen covers the entirety of the available surface area at 70' by 28' for a display surface area of 1960 square feet. The new video display surface is 165% larger than the original. New endzone video ribbons were upgraded to LED and 110' in length, while the new sound system is designed to improve clarity and definition. Additional amplifiers were installed during the summer of 2024 to maximize the abilities of the sound system.

== Structure and facilities ==
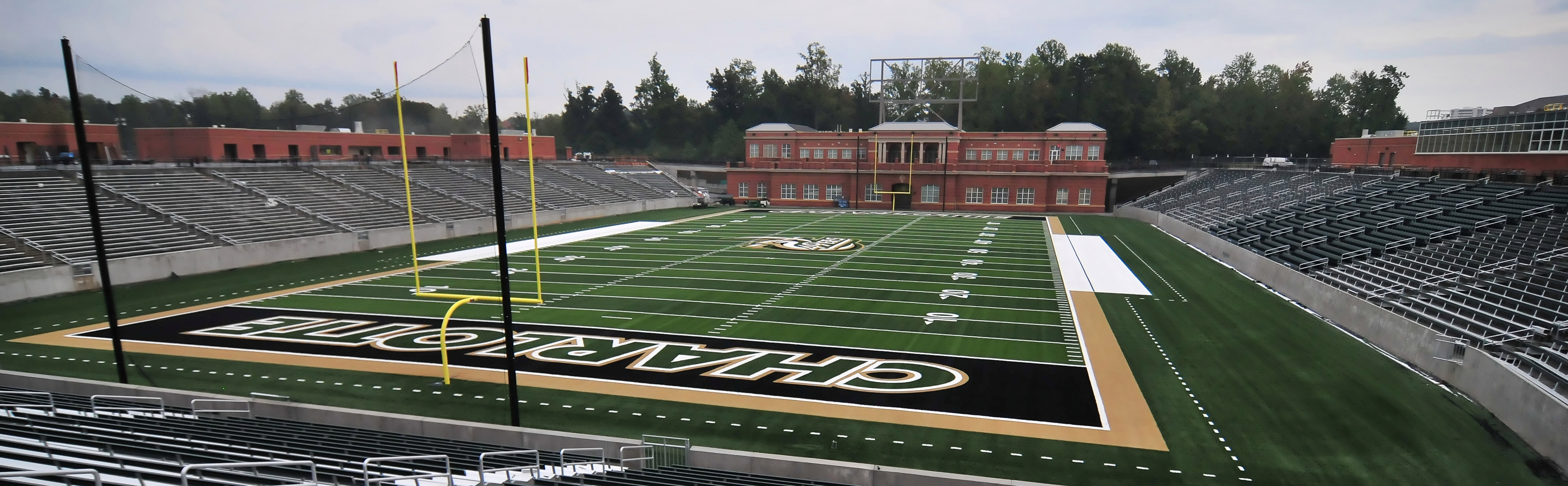
View from behind the north end zone, with student stands on the left, the Judy W. Rose Football Center in the center, and home side stands with a press box on the right

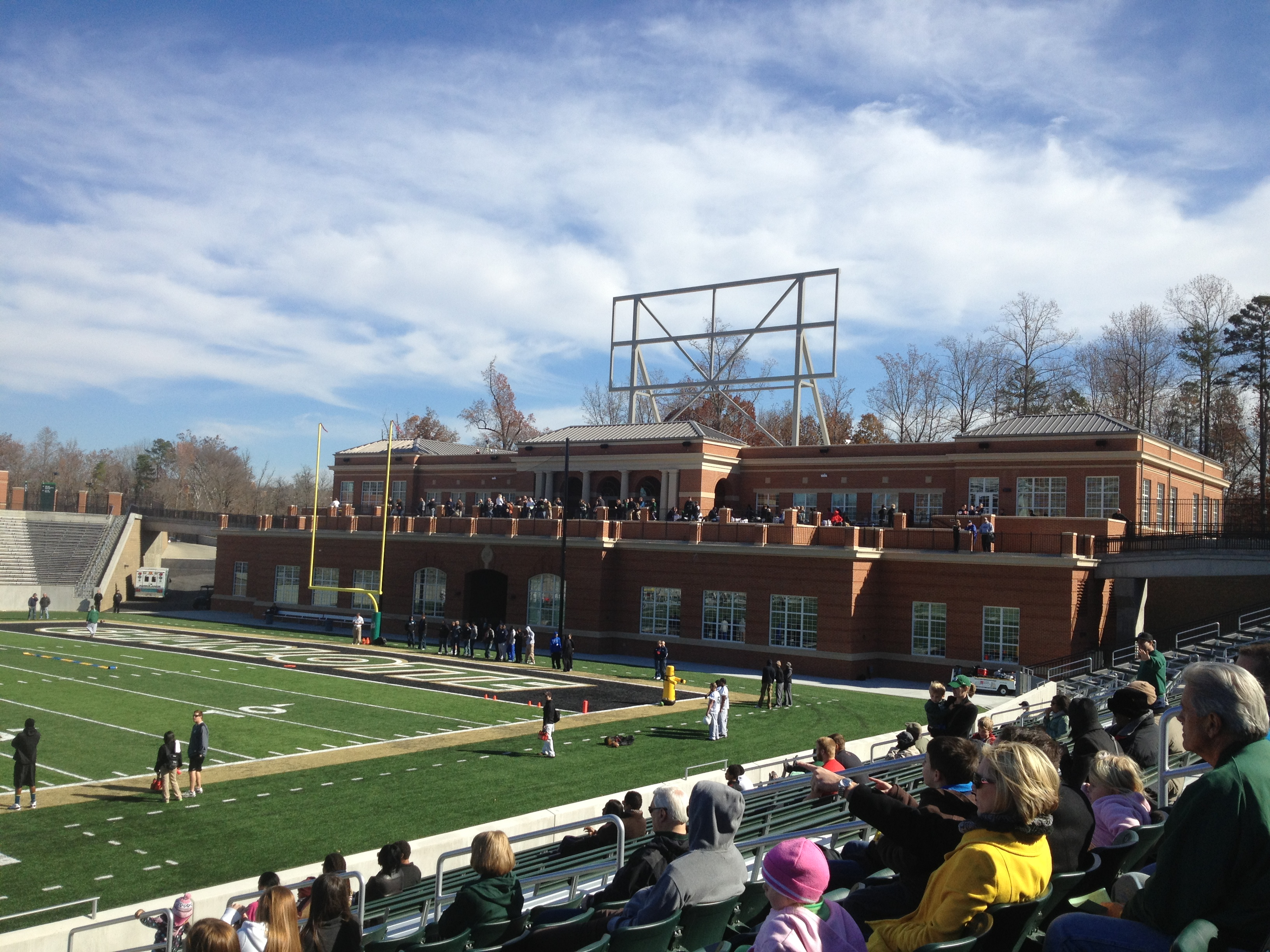
Judy W. Rose Football Center

Designed by Jenkins·Peer Architects and the DLR Group, the 25-acre (10 ha) facility is covered with UNC Charlotte's unique brick style, called "Morrocroft Special", from Hanson Brick. To better align with the rest of the Charlotte Research Institute Campus, which was laid out to match Tryon Street, the stadium is slightly off of the traditional north–south alignment of most American football stadiums. The 46,150-square-foot (4,287 m^{2}) Judy W. Rose Football Center, named for the school's long-time athletic director, is located on the southeastern end of the facility. The center includes various academic and athletic amenities. The facility also includes 145,000 square feet (13,500 m^{2}) of practice fields with a Bermuda sod grass turf, which are connected by a 70-foot (21 m) pedestrian bridge.

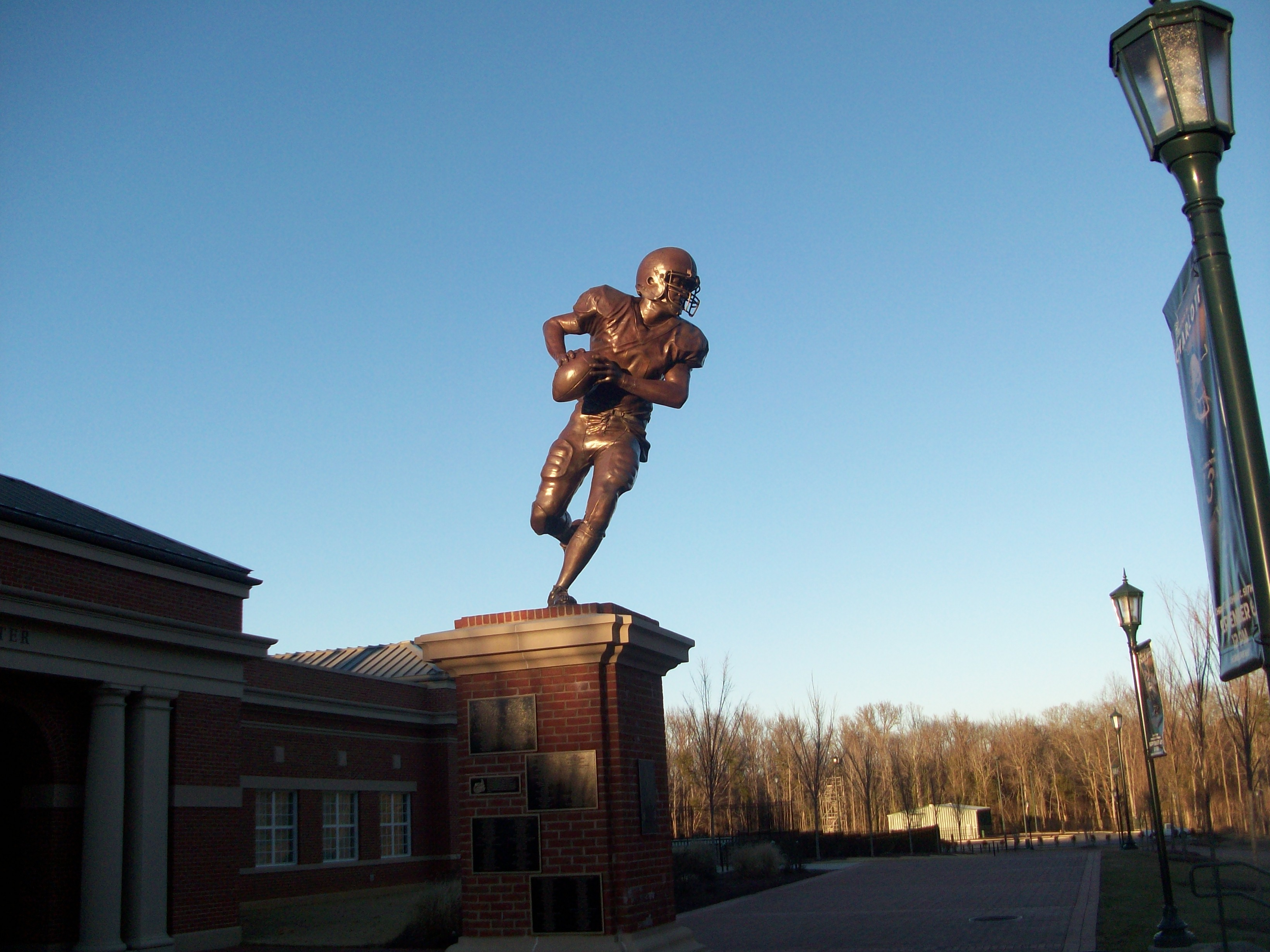
"Go Long" statue located at the south endzone

The stadium is an under grade level horseshoe-shaped structure around a 97,712-square-foot (9,077.7 m^{2}) playing surface, which is covered with artificial turf. The facility initially did not include floodlights, necessitating earlier kickoff times to avoid playing games at night until the 2015 season. The stands currently seat 15,314 with bleacher seats taking up 13,586. A 6,636-square-foot (616.5 m^{2}) press box, named for donors Steve and Vicki Luquire, sits above the home side stands. A 70-by-30-foot (21.3 m × 9.1 m) scoreboard, which includes a 70-by-28-foot (21.3 m × 8.5 m) video screen, is located behind the south end zone. Two separate field-level video boards are 37.8 by 3.1 feet (11.52 m × 0.94 m) tall. Two identical statues by sculptor Jon Hair, titled "Go Long", are located in front of the Judy Rose Football Center in the south endzone and at the main entrance of the stadium along the north endzone. Both statues were made possible by Charlotte businessman and philanthropist Irwin "Ike" Belk, who has funded similar statues at the 49ers other sports venues, in addition to other works of art on campuses across the region. Brass plaques are mounted to the statues' brick pedestals with the names of the original FSL owners and others who contributed to the funding for construction of the facility.

Home side seating is available with the purchase of a personal seat license fee for premium seating at games, which financed part of the stadium's construction. Fans can purchase up to four of approximately 5,500 licenses for seats between the 30-yard line and each end zone with a minimum $250 annual donation to the athletic department or between the 30-yard lines on either side of midfield for $1,500 each year, plus the cost of season tickets. Approximately 200 premium "White Gold Tier" seats, intended primarily for purchase by corporations, are also available for an undisclosed amount.

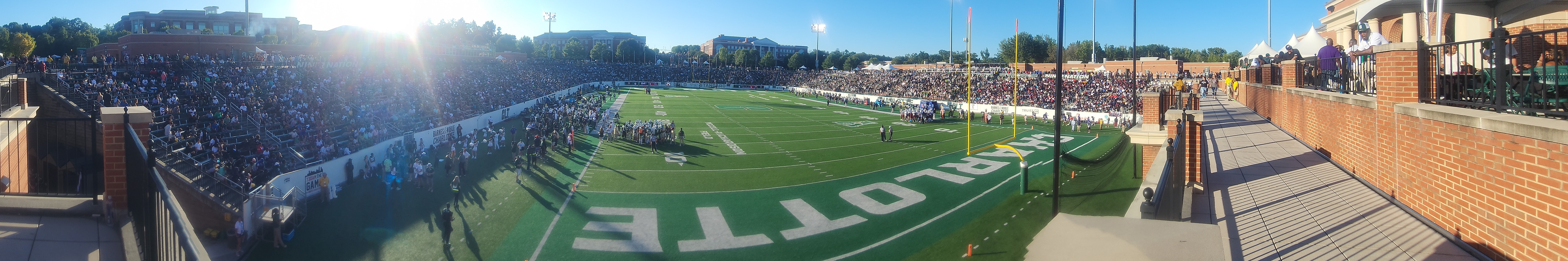
SC State at Charlotte, Sept. 2, 2023

== Transportation and location ==
Jerry Richardson Stadium is located near the campus entrance at Highway 29 (Tryon Street) north of Hayes Stadium in Charlotte. The school has announced various measures to control traffic on game days, including the closure of all entrances to the campus 5 hours prior to kickoff. Parking in designated lots around the campus on game days will be restricted to vehicles with an appropriate permit. The Lynx Blue Line provides light rail service to the stadium via JW Clay Boulevard/UNC Charlotte station.

UNC Charlotte’s bus system, Niner Transit, has scheduled stops along the Silver route. Roughly 2 hours before kickoff on days of a game, regular operations are reduced and the two football shuttles begin operations.

| Route | Station | | |
|---|---|---|---|
| Silver | CRI Deck | ↔ | PORTAL |
| Football North† | Light Rail West | ↔ | Football Stadium/Gate 1 |
| Football South† | Student Union West | ↔ | Football Stadium/Gate 1 |

† Only operates on football gamedays.

== Expansion ==
The stadium was designed to accommodate future expansions without major demolition. This became more likely on May 4, 2012, when the school accepted an invitation to rejoin Conference USA, a Football Bowl Subdivision conference. Possible changes to the stadium's structure from the expansion would include the addition of up to 24 luxury boxes, addition of a taller press box, and raising the stadium's capacity in several increments from 15,000 to 40,000 as demand warrants.

On May 23, 2022, the Charlotte 49ers announced their "Evergreen" Athletics Facilities Master Vision plan. The primary focus of Phase I and II of the plan would see the stadium expand to over 30,000 seats in capacity and include a new Press tower with additional luxury seating options. On September 22, 2023, the university secured $50 million for the stadium expansion project through the State Capital and Infrastructure Fund, which provided $25 million to match a gift of the same size offered by Charlotte real estate mogul and philanthropist Smoky Bissell. McMillan Pazdan Smith Architecture and SLAM were awarded the initial stadium expansion and renovation design contract.

On April 18, 2024, approval was granted for a stadium expansion project worth $60 million. The main focus of this project will be the construction of a new press and suite tower along the west side of the stadium. The new building will include premium seating options such as luxury suites, club seats, and loge boxes. The facility will also provide a dedicated team dining facility with additional meeting space available year round. The press tower will also provide access to a new upper deck area that will increase stadium capacity to 18,170 attendees. Construction is slated to begin in August 2025 and is expected to be completed in early 2027.

== Attendance records ==
| Rank | Attendance | Date | Game Result |
|---|---|---|---|
| 1 | 19,233 | September 6, 2025 | Charlotte 3, North Carolina 20 |
| 2 | 19,151 | September 8, 2018 | Charlotte 9, Appalachian State 45 |
| 3 | 18,651 | September 16, 2017 | Charlotte 31, North Carolina A&T 35 |
| 4 | 17,444 | September 26, 2015 | Charlotte 7, Florida Atlantic 17 |
| 5 | 17,102 | October 5, 2024 | Charlotte 55, East Carolina 24 |
| 6 | 16,715 | September 14, 2024 | Charlotte 27, Gardner–Webb 26 |
| 7 | 16,631 | September 12, 2015 | Charlotte 34, Presbyterian 10 |
| 8 | 16,630 | August 31, 2013 | Charlotte 52, Campbell 7 |
| 9 | 16,630 | September 14, 2013 | Charlotte 13, North Carolina Central 40 |
| 10 | 16,630 | October 12, 2013 | Charlotte 22, UNC Pembroke 45 |

== See also ==
- List of NCAA Division I FBS football stadiums
