= Cri Cri =

Cri Cri may refer to:

- Cri-Cri (character), a fictional character, an anthropomorphic cricket
- Cri-Cri (singer), stage name of Francisco Gabilondo Soler
- Cri Cri (TV series), an Italian television series
- Colomban Cri-cri, a very small aircraft

== See also ==
- CRI (disambiguation)
