= School of Political and Social Sciences, UNAM =

Coordinates: 19.31869°N 99.17812°W

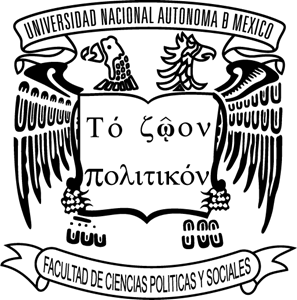

The Facultad de Ciencias Políticas y Sociales (FCPyS, Faculty of Political and Social Sciences) is a faculty within Mexico's Universidad Nacional Autónoma de México (UNAM), responsible for directing research and teaching programs in the fields of political science and social science. It was first established in 1951 as the Escuela Nacional de Ciencias Políticas y Sociales (ENCPyS, National School of Political and Social Sciences), before its conversion to full faculty status from 26 January 1968. FCPyS offers five academic degrees at the Licenciatura (undergraduate) level, in public administration, Communication studies, political science, international relations, sociology and anthropology. At a postgraduate level FCPyS offers Maestrías (Master's degrees) in five areas of study, and a Doctorado (doctorate) in political and social science that is oriented to one of five specialities. FCPyS also operates and has responsibility for a number of specialised semi-autonomous research institutions, such as the Centro de Relaciones Internacionales (CRI).

== Origin ==
Activities were inaugurated July 25 of 1951. The students were a total of 136 which included 129 men and 13 women, a bigger group than what was expected. One of the priorities for the establishment of the school was the syllabus, which sparked a debate of objectives between an approved school of France and Belgium and a more traditional view. Between 1949 and 1951 there were multiple discussions around where the Public Administration's classes should be imparted. On one side the Economics Faculty stated that Economics and politics were both part of the public space. The Law and Political Science Faculty declared that Law and Political Science couldn't separate.

The conflict was solved by negotiating that The Faculty of Economics would keep Public Administration as long as The National School of Political and Social Science would be able to create Political Science, Social Science, Diplomatic Science and Periodism.

The first principal was Ernesto Enríquez Coyro who declared himself against the syllabus, because he considered that practical knowledge was needed through field practices. Besides, that was not always taken into account. He also considered that conferences should be taken with formality by planning them ahead of time and publishing dates and topics with anticipation. That way students will be able to not only assist but also really participate and be part of the conferences actively.

== Study Plans ==
=== Political Science and Public Administration ===
Source:

=== International Relations ===
Source:

== Notable alumni ==
- Raquel Ramírez Salgado, Mexican educator, feminist and activist
- Carmen Aristegui, influential journalist
