= Raquel Ramírez Salgado =

Mexican women's rights activist

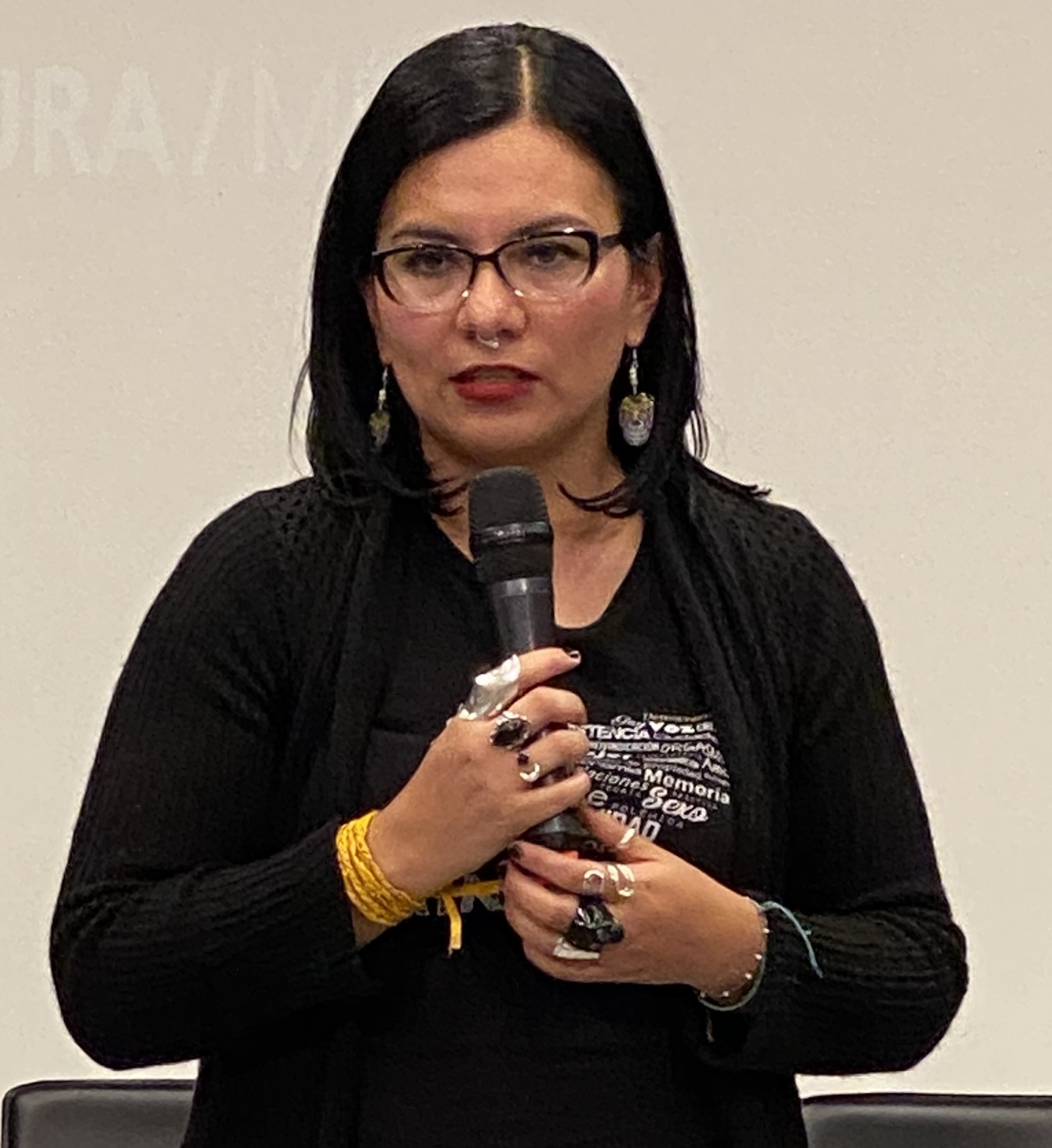
- Education: PhD
- Known for: Gender equality, inclusion

Raquel Ramírez Salgado is a Mexican researcher, communicator, feminist and women's rights activist.

== Biography ==
Ramírez graduated with a bachelor's and master's degree in Communication from the Faculty of Political and Social Sciences of the National Autonomous University of Mexico (UNAM). She also gained her PhD from that University. Ramírez also has a diploma in Preventive journalism from the Complutense University of Madrid. In 2016 and 2017 she completed a project on Inclusion, Intersectionality and Equity, with the Freie Universität Berlin In 2005 Ramírez began training people in feminism, equity and women's human rights. She founded the Feminist School of Communication whose purpose was to train social communicators with a gender perspective. Ramírez is an advisor on gender equality in institutions such as the National Institute for Women, Instituto Nacional Electoral and the Institute of Public Administration of the State of Hidalgo.

== Works ==
- Producing and Building My Citizenship: Media Education and the Human Rights of Young Women, 2017, The Journal of Media Literacy
- Educación para los medios y feminismo: una articulación que posibilita el empoderamiento de las mujeres, 2016, Communication papers: media literacy and gender studies
