= Centro de Relaciones Internacionales =

International relations school of the Nacional Autónoma de México

Coordinates: 19°19′05.49″N 99°10′42.41″W

International Relations Center [FCPyS - UNAM]
- Centro de Relaciones Internacionales
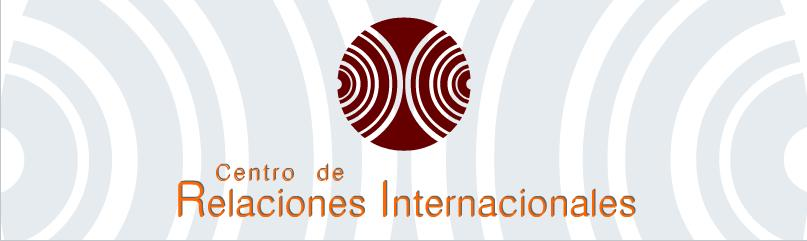
- Type: university research institute
- Established: 1970
- Director: Ignacio Martínez Cortés
- Location: Mexico City, Mexico
- Website: https://web.archive.org/web/20090921024820/http://www.politicas.unam.mx:80/carreras/ri/index.htm

The Centro de Relaciones Internacionales (CRI, International Relations Center) is an educational and research institute belonging to Mexico's Universidad Nacional Autónoma de México (UNAM). Founded in 1970, the CRI is attached to UNAM's Facultad de Ciencias Políticas y Sociales (FCPyS, Faculty of Political and Social Sciences) and offers academic degrees in international relations studies and theory.

== History ==
UNAM was the first academic institution in Mexico to implement study and research programs in the field of international relations studies. Its first university program in the area was created in 1952, called "Diplomatic Sciences Degree". This degree was created to offer multidisciplinary studies combining elements from History, Law and Politics.

In 1968, a reform transformed the degree program to a dedicated "International Relations Degree". In 1970, the CRI was formed as a distinct research and teaching center under the auspices and administration of the political and social sciences faculty (FCPyS) to coordinate UNAM's programs and research in international relations topics.

== Programs ==
Currently the CRI divides its teaching and research programs into six areas:

- Theory and Methodology of International relations
- International politics
- International law
- International economy
- Mexican Foreign Policy
- Regional Studies
