= Charlotte Research Institute =

US research institute partnership

Coordinates: 35.301448°N 80.731274°W

The Charlotte Research Institute (CRI) was a partnership between the University of North Carolina at Charlotte and corporations in the region. In 2019, the university retired that brand and model, and the institute's functions are now known as the Office of Research Partnerships (ORP).

== Purpose ==
The goal of CRI was to develop technology-based academic and business partnerships, ranging from consultation to onsite collaborative research. The institute's support of education and research included three centers: eBusiness, Optoelectronics and Optical Communications, and Precision Metrology.

The CRI was located on UNC Charlotte's Millennial Campus.

== CRI Millennial Campus facilities ==
Academics

- Bioinformatics Building
- Duke Centennial Hall
- Energy Production and Infrastructure Center (EPIC)
- Grigg Hall
- Kulwicki Motorsports Laboratory
- Partnership, Outreach, and Research to Accelerate Learning (PORTAL)

Athletics

- Robert and Mariam Hayes Stadium
- Jerry Richardson Stadium

== Photos ==
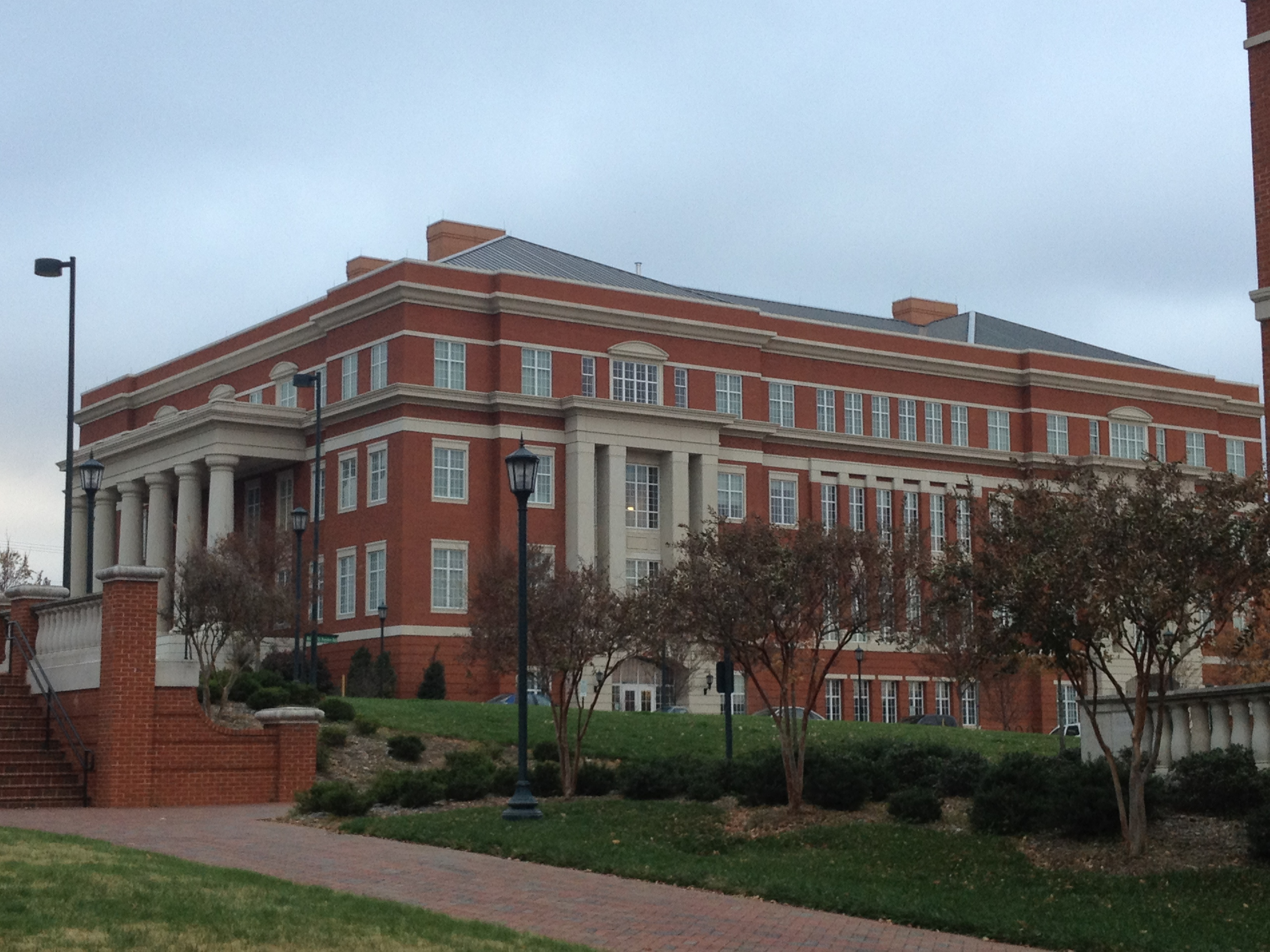
Bioinformatics Building

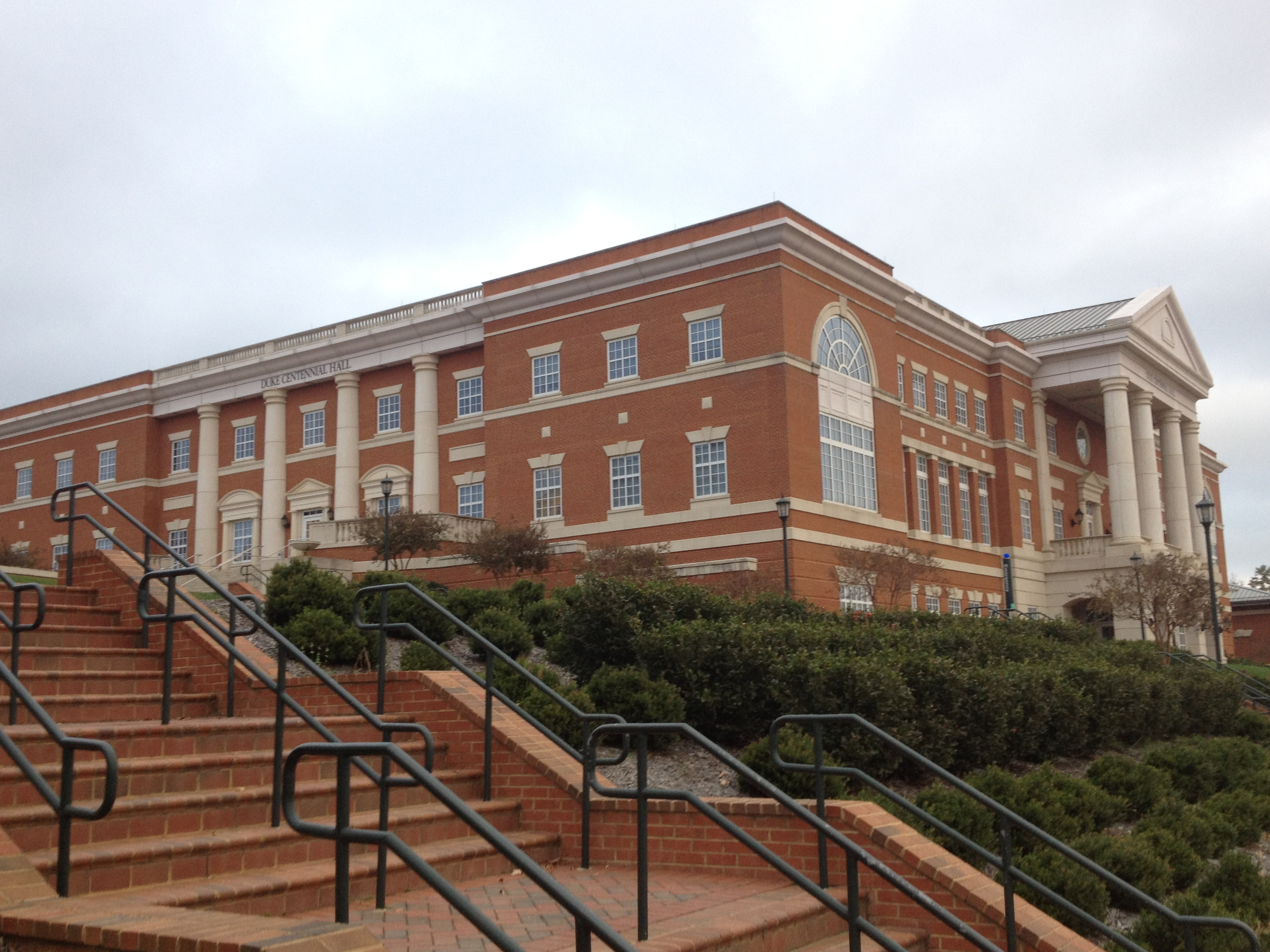
Duke Centennial Hall

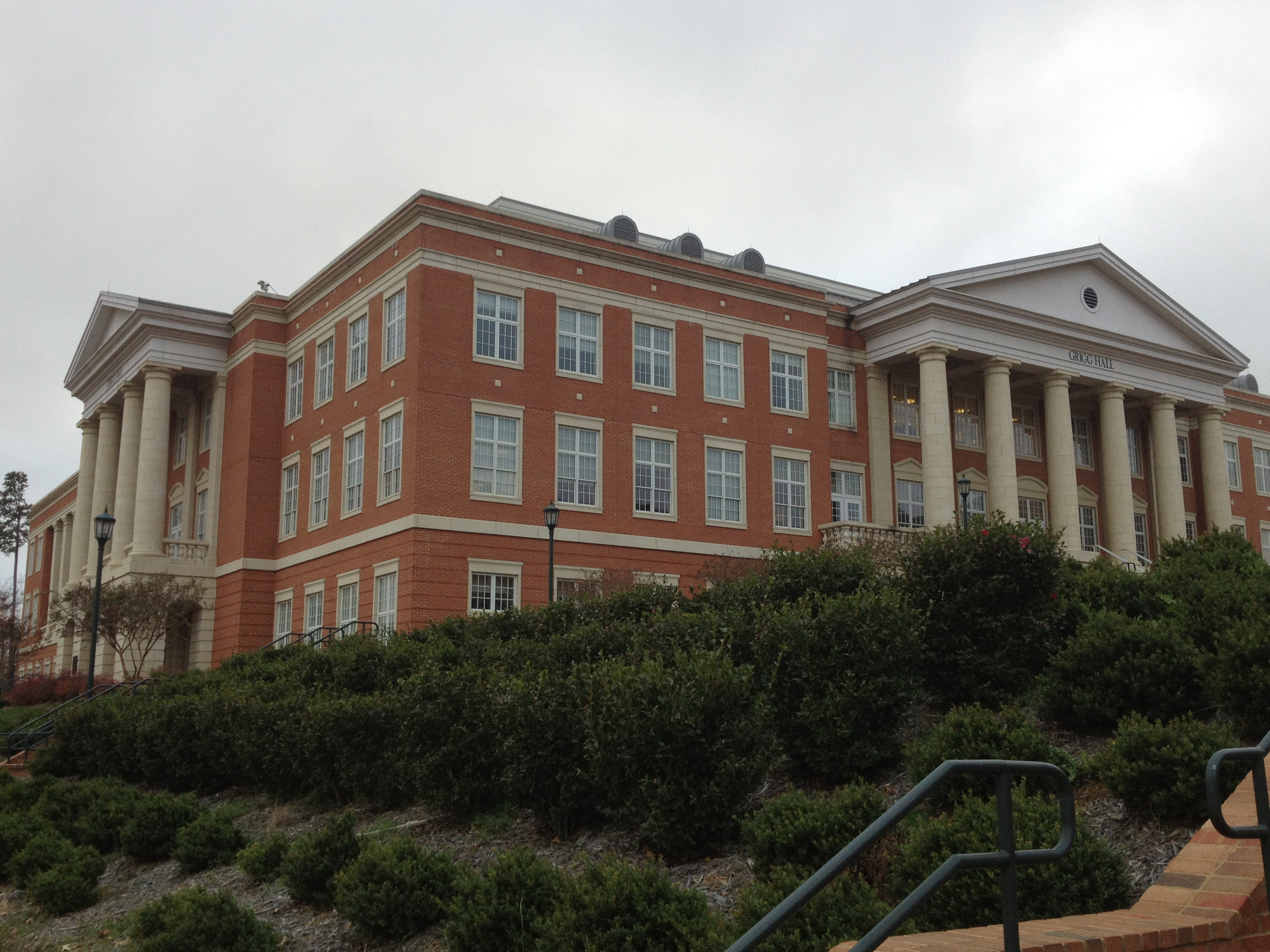
Grigg Hall

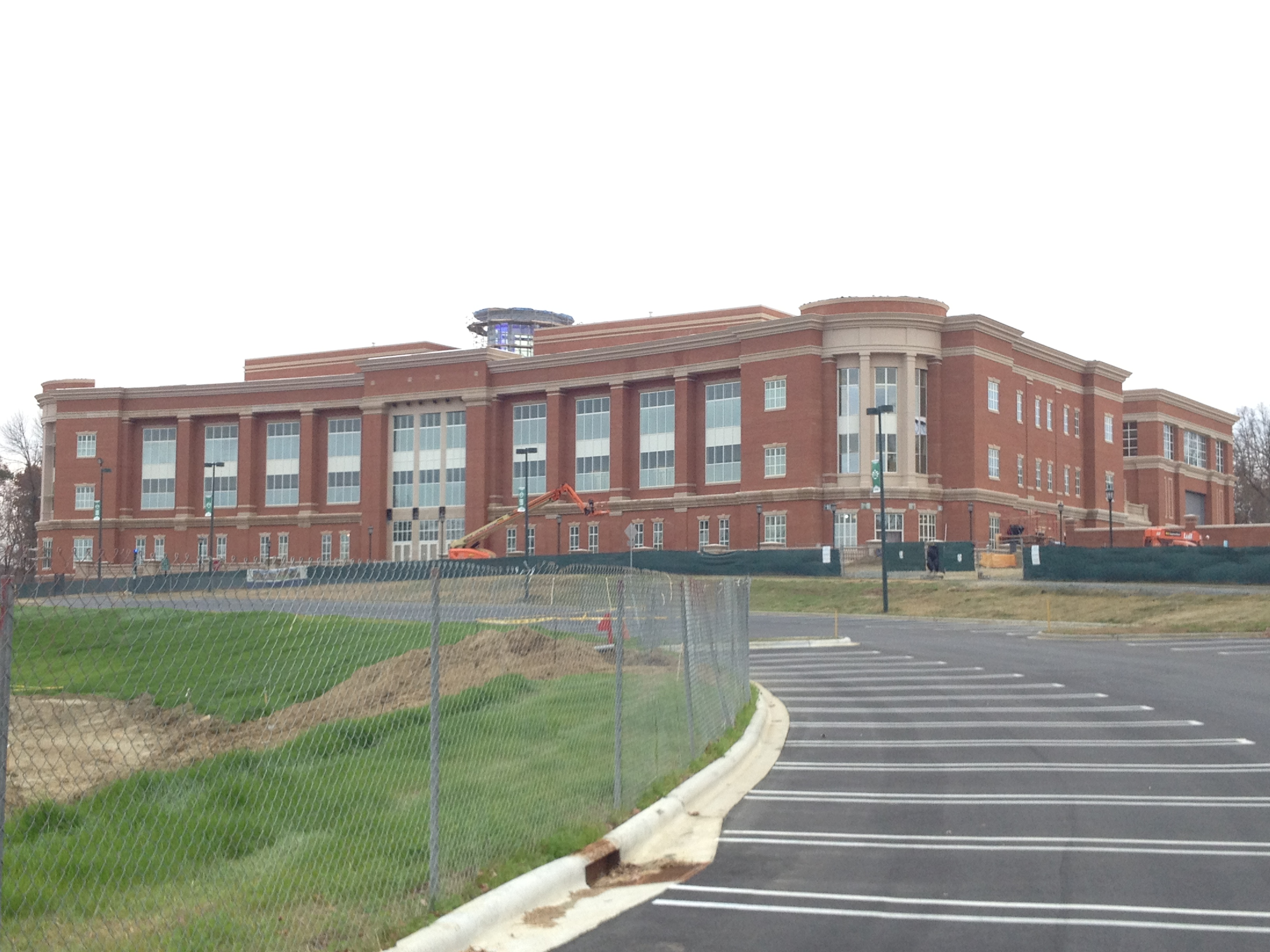
EPIC

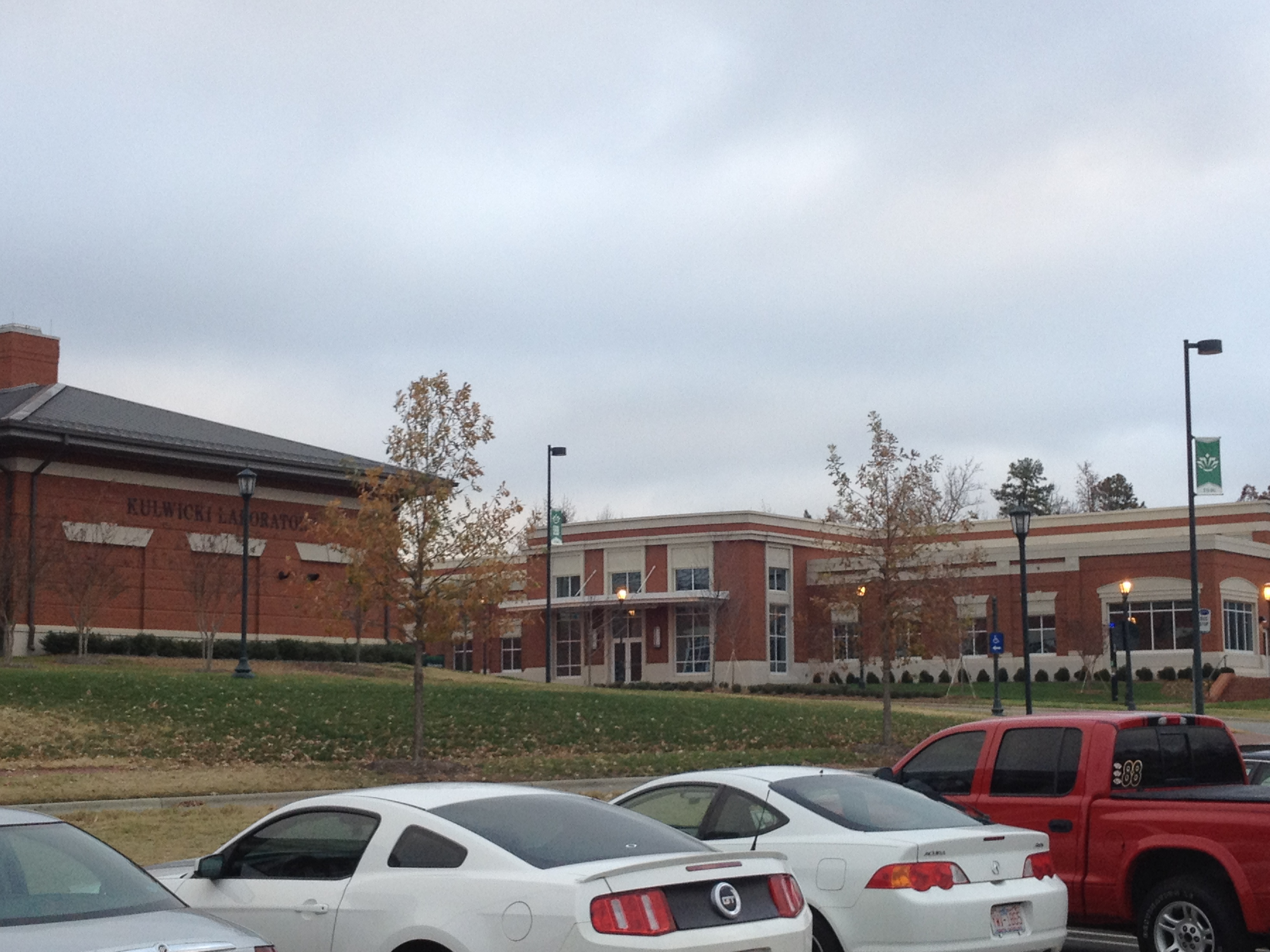
Kulwicki Motorsports Laboratory

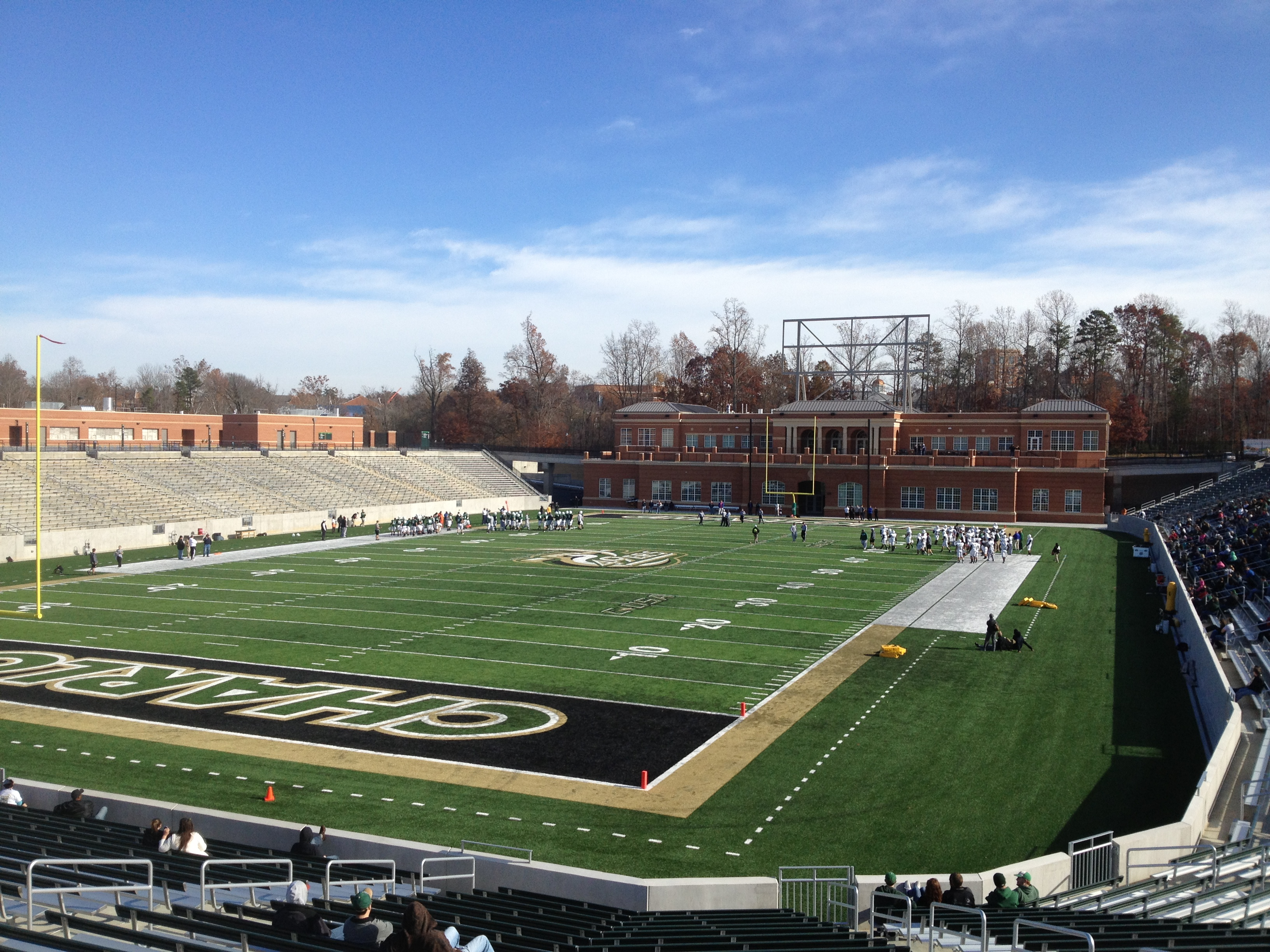
McColl-Richardson Field

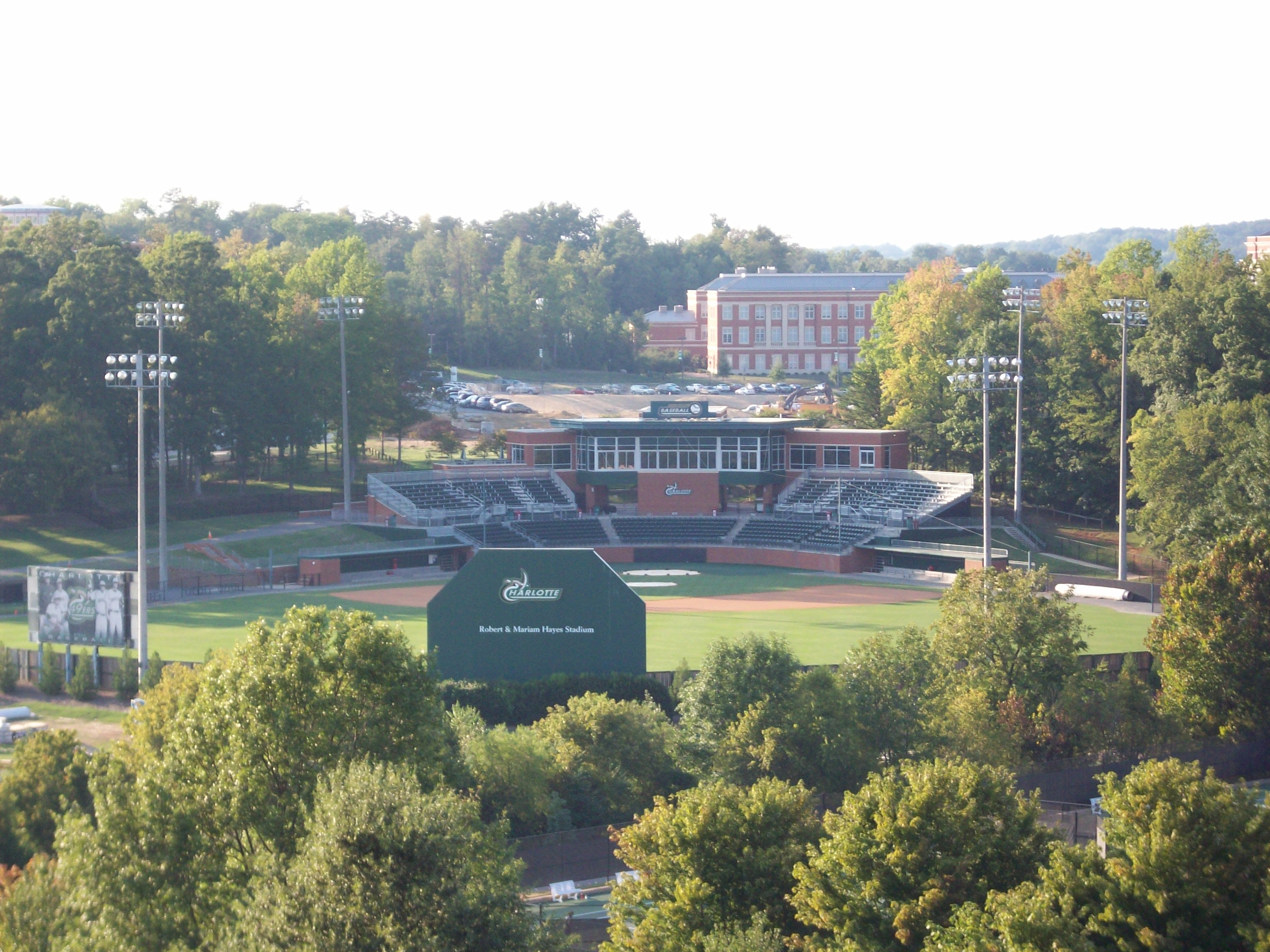
Hayes Stadium

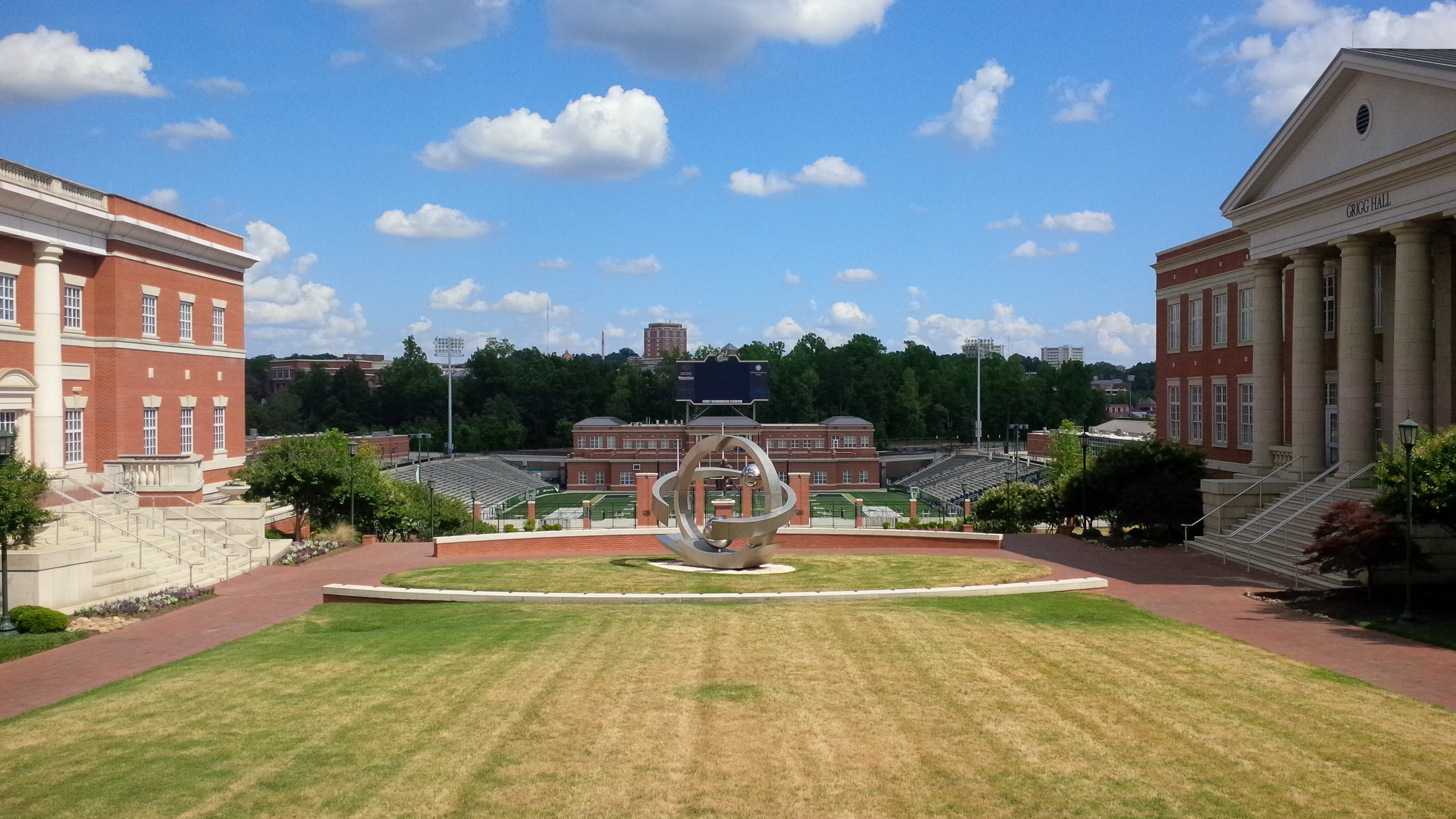
Charlotte Research Institute Central Quad.

== Research partners ==
- University of North Carolina at Charlotte
- NC State University
- NC A&T
- Duke University
- Western Carolina University
- Clemson University
- Massachusetts Institute of Technology
- Oak Ridge National Laboratory
- Idaho National Engineering and Environmental Laboratory
- California Institute of Technology
- NASA Jet Propulsion Laboratory
- GE Research Lab
- University of Vermont School of Medicine
- Boeing Aerospace
- National Ignition Facility
