= List of Texas companies =

Location of Texas

Texas is a state in the South Central region of the United States. The region's second-quarter 2018 gross state product was 8.6% of the GDP of the country at $1.755 trillion, with significant growth in mining, quarrying, and oil and gas extraction. The state ranked third on Forbes list of Best States For Business in 2018, noting strong growth, employment and income and a primary target for corporate relocations over the last six years.

== Largest firms ==
This list shows firms in the Fortune 500, which ranks firms by total revenues reported before January 31, 2018. Only the top five firms (if available) are included as a sample.

Rank	Image	Name	Revenues (USD $M)	Employees	Notes
2		ExxonMobil	244,363	71,200	Multinational oil and gas company and largest of the Big Oil entities. The firm is headquartered in Spring, Texas north of Houston. Subsidiaries include Exxon, Mobil, and Esso.
9		AT&T	160,546	254,000	Multinational telecommunications holding company which includes many components of the former Bell System. Headquartered in Dallas, the company includes Cricket Wireless and DirecTV.
28		Phillips 66	91,568	14,600	Global oil and gas entity formed when it spun off from ConocoPhillips in 2012. The firm is headquartered in the Westchase district of Houston.
31		Valero Energy	88,407	10,015	International oil and gas refiner, marketer and distribution company. The company is headquartered in San Antonio and divested itself of retail operations in 2013 through the formation of CST Brands.
35		Dell Technologies	78,660	145,000	Multinational technology firm based in Round Rock, near Austin in central Texas. The company's historical focus was personal computers, but now offers a range of technology products and services.

== Notable firms ==
This list includes notable companies with primary headquarters located in the state. The industry and sector follow the Industry Classification Benchmark taxonomy. Organizations which have ceased operations are included and noted as defunct.

Notable companies Status: P=Private, S=State; A=Active, D=Defunct
Name	Industry	Sector	Headquarters	Founded	Notes	Status	
7-Eleven	Consumer services	Broadline retailers	Dallas	1927	Convenience store chain	P	A
Acme Brick	Industrials	Building materials & fixtures	Fort Worth	1891	Brick and masonry	P	A
Airbus Helicopters, Inc.	Industrials	Aerospace	Grand Prairie	1969	Part of Airbus (Netherlands)	P	A
American Airlines	Consumer services	Airlines	Fort Worth	1936	Airline, part of American Airlines Group	P	A
American Airlines Group	Consumer services	Airlines	Fort Worth	2013	Airline holding company	P	A
American National Insurance Company	Financials	Full line insurance	Galveston	1905	National insurance firm	P	A
APA Corporation	Oil & gas	Exploration & production	Houston	1954	Hydrocarbon exploration	P	A
Aspyr	Technology	Software	Austin	1996	Video games	P	A
AT&T	Conglomerate	-	Dallas	1983	Telecommunications, technology, entertainment	P	A
Atmos Energy	Oil & gas	Pipelines	Dallas	1906	Natural gas distribution, Energy	P	A
Baker Hughes	Oil & gas	Oil equipment & services	Houston	1907	Oil field services	P	A
Beal Bank	Financials	Banks	Plano	1988	Banking	P	A
Bell Helicopter	Industrials	Aerospace	Fort Worth	1935	Military and commercial helicopters, Aviation	P	A
Bennigan's	Consumer services	Restaurants & bars	Dallas	1976	Restaurant chain	P	A
Berry Aviation	Consumer services	Airlines	San Marcos	1983	Charter airline	P	A
Black-eyed Pea	Consumer services	Restaurants & bars	Houston	1975	Restaurant chain	P	A
Blue Bell Creameries	Consumer goods	Food products	Brenham	1907	Ice cream, Food Products	P	A
BNSF Railway	Industrials	Railroads	Fort Worth	1996	Freight rail	P	A
Bombay Company	Consumer services	Specialty retailers	Fort Worth	1978	Furniture	P	A
Borden Dairy	Consumer goods	Food products	Dallas	2009	Dairy	P	A
Brantly International	Industrials	Aerospace	Coppell	1945	Helicopters, Aviation	P	A
Brinker International	Consumer services	Restaurants & bars	Dallas	1991	Holding company of Chili's and Maggiano's Little Italy	P	A
Broadway Bank	Financials	Banks	San Antonio	1941	Community bank	P	A
Brookshire Brothers	Consumer services	Food retailers & wholesalers	Lufkin	1921	Grocery	P	A
Brookshire Grocery Company	Consumer services	Food retailers & wholesalers	Tyler	1928	Grocery	P	A
Burger Street	Consumer services	Restaurants & bars	Dallas	1985	Fast food chain	P	A
Cameron International	Oil & gas	Oil equipment & services	Houston	1920	Oil well services	P	A
Carino's Italian	Consumer services	Restaurants & bars	Austin	1968	Italian chain	P	A
Carter Aviation Technologies	Industrials	Aerospace	Wichita Falls	1994	Aerospace technology	P	A
Celanese	Basic materials	Specialty chemicals	Irving	1918	Chemicals	P	A
CenterPoint Energy	Utilities	Gas distribution	Houston	1882	Natural gas utility	P	A
Central Market	Consumer services	Food retailers & wholesalers	Dallas	1994	Specialized grocer; part of H-E-B	P	A
Chicken Express	Consumer services	Restaurants & bars	Burleson	1988	Fast food chain	P	A
Chili's	Consumer services	Restaurants & bars	Dallas	1975	Restaurant chain	P	A
Chuck E. Cheese's	Consumer services	Restaurants & bars	Irving	1977	Restaurant and entertainment chain	P	A
Cicis	Consumer services	Restaurants & bars	Plano	1985	Pizza chain	P	A
Cinemark Theatres	Consumer services	Recreational services	Plano	1984	Theater chain	P	A
Citgo	Oil & gas	Integrated oil & gas	Houston	1910	Owned by PDVSA (Venezuela)	P	A
Clear Channel Outdoor	Outdoor advertising	Billboards	San Antonio	1901/1972	Owned by iHeartMedia and Mubadala Investment Company	P	A
Commercial Metals Company	Basic materials	Iron & steel	Irving	1915	Steel and metals	P	A
ConocoPhillips	Oil & gas	Exploration & production	Houston	1875	Oil exploration and production	P	A
The Container Store	Consumer services	Specialty retailers	Coppell	1978	Storage retailer	P	A
Cooper Industries	Industrials	Electrical components & equipment	Houston	1833	Now part of Eaton Corporation (Ireland)	P	D
Curves International	Consumer services	Specialized consumer services	Waco	1992	Fitness chain	P	A
D. R. Horton	Consumer goods	Home construction	Arlington	1978	Homebuilder	P	A
DallasNews Corporation	Consumer services	Publishing	Dallas	2008	Newspapers	P	A
DataTreasury	Technology	Software	Plano	1998	Financial software	P	A
Dave & Buster's	Consumer services	Restaurants & bars	Dallas	1982	Restaurant and entertainment chain	P	A
Dean Foods	Consumer goods	Food products	Dallas	1925	Food and beverage	P	A
Dell	Technology	Computer hardware	Round Rock	1984	Computers and hardware	P	A
Dell EMC	Technology	Computer storage	Round Rock	1979/2016	Subsidiary of Dell	P	A
Dell Technologies	Technology	Computer services	Round Rock	2016	Parent of Dell and Dell EMC	P	A
Diamondback Energy	Oil & gas	Exploration & production	Midland	2007	Hydrocarbon exploration	P	A
Dick Clark Architecture	Industrials	Business support services	Austin	1979	Architects	P	A
Dickies	Consumer goods	Clothing & accessories	Fort Worth	1922	Apparel, part of VF Corporation	P	A
Dr Pepper Snapple Group	Consumer goods	Soft drinks	Plano	2008	Part of Keurig Dr Pepper	P	A
Energy Transfer Partners	Oil & gas	Pipelines	Dallas	1995	Pipeline transport	P	A
Enterprise Products	Oil & gas	Pipelines	Houston	1968	Pipeline transport	P	A
Envoy Air	Consumer services	Airlines	Irving	1984	Formerly American Eagle, part of American Airlines Group	P	A
EOG Resources	Oil & gas	Exploration & production	Houston	1999	Hydrocarbon exploration	P	A
ExxonMobil	Oil & gas	Integrated oil & gas	Irving	1999	Energy and petrochemicals	P	A
FedEx Office	Consumer services	Specialized consumer services	Plano	1970	Formerly Kinko's, now part of FedEx	P	A
Fiesta Mart	Consumer services	Food retailers & wholesalers	Houston	1972	Supermarket chain	P	A
Flowserve	Industrials	Industrial machinery	Irving	1997	Industrial and environmental machinery	P	A
Fluor Corporation	Industrials	Heavy construction	Irving	1912	Engineering and construction	P	A
Fossil Group	Consumer goods	Clothing & accessories	Richardson	1984	Fashion designer	P	A
Fred Loya Insurance	Financials	Property & casualty insurance	El Paso	1990	Auto insurance	P	A
Frito-Lay	Consumer goods	Food products	Plano	1961	Packaged foods	P	A
Frost Bank	Financials	Banks	San Antonio	1868	Bank and financial services	P	A
Fuddruckers	Consumer services	Restaurants & bars	Houston	1979	Restaurant chain	P	A
Funimation	Consumer services	Broadcasting & entertainment	Flower Mound	1994	Part of Sony Pictures Television	P	D
GAINSCO	Financials	Full line insurance	Dallas	1978	Insurance and financial services	P	A
GameStop	Consumer services	Specialty retailers	Grapevine	1984	Games and electronics retailer	P	A
Gerland Corporation	Consumer services	Food retailers & wholesalers	Houston	1967	Grocery	P	A
Globe Life	Financials	Life insurance	McKinney	1900	Life insurance	P	A
GM Financial	Financials	Consumer finance	Fort Worth	1992	Part of General Motors	P	A
Gold's Gym	Consumer services	Specialized consumer services	Dallas	1965	Fitness chain	P	A
Goodman Global	Industrials	Electronic equipment	Houston	1975	HVAC	P	A
Greyhound Lines	Consumer services	Travel & tourism	Dallas	1914	Bus	P	A
Group 1 Automotive	Consumer services	Specialty retailers	Houston	1997	Auto retailer	P	A
Guaranty Bank & Trust	Financials	Banks	Mount Pleasant	1913	Commercial bank	P	A
Gutterth	Consumer services	Recreational services	Denton	2006	Event management	P	A
Half Price Books	Consumer services	Specialty retailers	Dallas	1972	Book retailer	P	A
Halliburton	Oil & gas	Integrated oil & gas	Houston	1919	Oil field services	P	A
Hamilton Shirts	Consumer goods	Clothing & accessories	Houston	1883	Clothier	P	A
HealthMarkets	Financials	Full line insurance	North Richland Hills	1983	Health insurance	P	A
H-E-B	Consumer services	Food retailers & wholesalers	San Antonio	1905	Supermarket chain	P	A
Helpinstill	Consumer goods	Consumer electronics	Houston	1972	Piano pickups	P	A
Hewlett Packard Enterprise	Technology	Computer services	Spring	2015	Split into HP Inc. and the company itself	P	A
Hitachi Consulting	Technology	Computer services	Dallas	2000	IT consulting	P	A
HKN, Inc.	Oil & gas	Exploration & production	Southlake	1973	Gas exploration	P	A
iHeartMedia	Consumer services	Media agencies	San Antonio	1972	Formerly Clear Channel Communications	P	A
Imperial Sugar	Consumer goods	Food products	Sugar Land	1843	Sugar, part of Louis Dreyfus Company (Netherlands)	P	A
Intercontinental Manufacturing Company	Industrials	Aerospace	Dallas	1948	Tractors, later aircraft	P	D
International Bank of Commerce	Financials	Banks	Laredo	1966	Bank	P	A
Interstate Batteries	Consumer goods	Auto parts	Dallas	1952	Automotive batteries	P	A
J. C. Penney	Consumer services	Broadline retailers	Plano	1902	Department stores	P	A
James Avery Artisan Jewelry	Consumer goods	Clothing & accessories	Kerrville	1954	Jewelry	P	A
Jason's Deli	Consumer services	Restaurants & bars	Beaumont	1976	Restaurant chain	P	A
Jiffy Lube	Consumer services	Specialized consumer services	Houston	1971	Automotive services	P	A
Jim's Restaurants	Consumer services	Restaurants & bars	San Antonio	1947	Restaurant chain	P	A
KBR	Industrials	Heavy construction	Houston	1901	Construction and procurement	P	A
Keurig Dr Pepper	Consumer goods	Soft drinks	Plano	1981	Part of JAB Holding Company	P	A
Kimberly-Clark	Consumer goods	Personal products	Irving	1872	Personal care products	P	A
Kinder Morgan	Oil & gas	Pipelines	Houston	1997	Gas pipelines and terminals	P	A
La Quinta Inns & Suites	Consumer services	Hotels	Irving	1968	Hotel chain	P	A
Landry's	Consumer services	Recreational services	Houston	1980	Restaurants and entertainment holding	P	A
Lennox International	Industrials	Industrial machinery	Richardson	1895	HVAC	P	A
LGI Homes	Consumer goods	Home construction	The Woodlands	2002	Homes	P	A
Luby's	Consumer services	Restaurants & bars	Houston	1947	Restaurant chain	P	A
LyondellBasell	Basic materials	Commodity chemicals	Houston	2007	Chemical company	P	A
Maggiano's Little Italy	Consumer services	Restaurants & bars	Dallas	1991	Restaurant chain	P	A
Marathon Oil	Oil & gas	Exploration & production	Houston	1887	Petroleum exploration	P	A
Market Basket	Consumer services	Food retailers & wholesalers	Nederland	1962	Supermarket chain	P	A
Marshall Pottery	Consumer goods	Durable household products	Marshall	1895	Pottery	P	A
Mary Kay	Consumer goods	Personal products	Addison	1963	Multi-level marketing; cosmetics	P	A
McDermott International	Industrials	Business support services	Houston	1923	Engineering and procurement	P	A
Merit Energy Company	Oil & gas	Exploration and production	Dallas	1989	Oil and gas production	P	A
The Michaels Companies	Consumer services	Specialty retailers	Irving	2013	Arts and crafts retailer	P	A
Moody National Bank	Financials	Banks	Galveston	1907	Bank	P	A
Mooney International Corporation	Industrials	Aerospace	Kerrville	1929	Light aircraft	P	A
Mr. Gatti's	Consumer services	Restaurants & bars	Fort Worth	1964	Pizza chain	P	A
Music Audience Exchange	Consumer services	Broadcasting & entertainment	Frisco	2014	Music agency	P	A
National Instruments	Industrials	Electronic equipment	Austin	1976	Test equipment	P	A
NatureSweet	Consumer goods	Food products	San Antonio	1990	Produce packer	P	A
Neiman Marcus	Consumer services	Broadline retailers	Dallas	1907	Department stores	P	A
Noble Energy	Oil & gas	Exploration & production	Houston	1932	Hydrocarbon exploration	P	D
NOV Inc.	Oil & gas	Oil equipment & services	Houston	1862	Oilfield equipment	P	A
NRG Energy	Utilities	Electricity generation	Houston	1989	Energy	P	A
Occidental Petroleum	Oil & gas	Exploration & production	Houston	1920	Hydrocarbon exploration	P	A
Ojos Locos	Consumer services	Restaurants & bars	Plano	2010	Restaurant chain	P	A
Oracle Corporation	Technology	Computer services	Austin	1977	Formerly headquartered in Redwood Shores	P	A
Panda Energy International	Utilities	Alternative electricity	Dallas	1982	Environmental-friendly power plants	P	D
Permian Basin Royalty Trust	Financials	Asset managers	Fort Worth	1980	Royalty trust	P	A
Peterbilt	Industrials	Commercial vehicles & trucks	Denton	1939	Trucks	P	A
Pier 1 Imports	Consumer services	Specialty retailers	Fort Worth	1962	Home furnishings	P	A
Pizza Hut	Consumer services	Restaurants & bars	Plano	1958	Pizza chain	P	A
Pizza Inn	Consumer services	Restaurants & bars	Dallas	1958	Pizza chain	P	A
Plains All American Pipeline	Oil & gas	Pipelines	Houston	1998	Oil and gas pipelines	P	A
PlainsCapital Bank	Financials	Banks	Lubbock	1998	Bank	P	A
Ponderosa and Bonanza Steakhouses	Consumer services	Restaurants & bars	Plano	1965	Steakhouse chain	P	A
Quanta Services	Oil & gas	Oil equipment & services	Houston	1997	Energy infrastructure	P	A
Rackspace Technology	Technology	Internet	San Antonio	1998	Cloud computing	P	A
RadioShack	Consumer services	Specialty retailers	Fort Worth	1921	Consumer electronics retailer	P	A
Randalls	Consumer services	Food retailers & wholesalers	Houston	1966	Grocery	P	A
Rave Cinemas	Consumer services	Recreational services	Dallas	1999	Theaters	P	A
Reddy Ice	Consumer goods	Food products	Dallas	1988	Ice	P	A
Redneck Heaven	Consumer services	Restaurants & bars	Lewisville	2008	Sports bars	P	D
Reliant Energy	Utilities	Conventional electricity	Houston	2000	Energy	P	A
Rent-A-Center	Consumer services	Specialty retailers	Plano	1973	Rentals	P	A
Sabre Corporation	Technology	Software	Southlake	1960	Travel software	P	A
Schlumberger	Oil & gas	Oil equipment & services	Houston	1926	Oilfield services	P	A
Service Corporation International	Consumer services	Specialized consumer services	Houston	1962	Funeral services	P	A
Setcom Corporation	Technology	Telecommunications equipment	Austin	1970	Communications equipment	P	A
The Shaw Group	Industrials	Building materials & fixtures	Houston	1983	Pipe and steel fabrication	P	A
Shell Oil Company	Oil & gas	Integrated oil & gas	Houston	1912	Part of Royal Dutch Shell (Netherlands)	P	A
Six Flags	Consumer services	Recreational services	Grand Prairie	1961	Theme parks	P	A
Smoothie King	Consumer services	Restaurants & bars	Coppell	1973	Smoothies	P	A
Souper Salad	Consumer services	Restaurants & bars	Dallas	1978	Restaurant chain	P	A
Southwest Airlines	Consumer services	Airlines	Dallas	1967	Low-cost airline	P	A
Southwestern National Bank	Financials	Banks	Houston	1997	Bank	P	A
SpaceX	Consumer services	Space and telecommunications	Starbase	2002	Part of Elon Musk	P	A
SpaceXAI	Consumer services	Aerospace	Bastrop	2023	Part of Elon Musk	P	A
Spaghetti Warehouse	Consumer services	Restaurants & bars	Dallas	1972	Restaurant chain	P	A
Spira	Consumer goods	Footwear	El Paso	2002	Footwear	P	D
Spoetzl Brewery	Consumer goods	Brewers	Shiner	1909	Brewery	P	A
Stage Stores	Consumer services	Specialty retailers	Houston	1988	Apparel and cosmetics	P	D
Steak and Ale	Consumer services	Restaurants & bars	Dallas	1966	Restaurants	P	D
Strayer Voigt Inc	Industrials	Defense	Grand Prairie	1994	Firearms	P	A
Synergyst Research	Clinical research	Medicine and biotech	San Antonio	2006	Providing medicine	P	A
Sysco	Consumer goods	Food products	Houston	1969	Food distribution	P	A
T.G.I. Friday's	Consumer services	Restaurants & bars	Dallas	1965	Restaurant chain	P	A
Taco Bueno	Consumer services	Restaurants & bars	Irving	1967	Restaurant chain	P	A
Taco Cabana	Consumer services	Restaurants & bars	San Antonio	1978	Restaurant chain	P	A
Taco Palenque	Consumer services	Restaurants & bars	Laredo	1987	Restaurant chain	P	A
Tailored Brands	Consumer services	Apparel retailers	Houston	1973	Men's apparel	P	A
Tandy Corporation	Technology	Computer hardware	Fort Worth	1919	Computer hardware	P	D
Tenet Healthcare	Health care	Health care providers	Dallas	1967	Health care services	P	A
Tesla, Inc.	Automotive	Automotive and Renewable energy	Austin	2003	Automotive	P	A
Texas Instruments	Technology	Semiconductors	Dallas	1930	Semiconductors	P	A
Texas Precious Metals	Consumer services	Specialty retailers	Shiner	2011	Gold retailers	P	A
TicketCity	Consumer services	Live events	Austin	1990	Ticket Sales	P	A
Tokio Marine HCC	Financials	Property & casualty insurance	Houston	1974	Insurance	P	A
Tom Thumb	Consumer services	Food retailers & wholesalers	Roanoke	1948	Grocery, part of Albertsons	P	A
Toyota Motor North America	Automotive	Automotive	Plano	2017	Automotive	P	A
TPG Inc.	Financials	Real estate holding & development	Fort Worth	1992	Investment company	P	A
Trinity Industries	Industrials	Diversified industrials	Dallas	1933	Construction, energy, transportation	P	A
Twin Peaks	Consumer services	Restaurants & bars	Addison	2008	Restaurant chain	P	A
TXU Energy	Utilities	Conventional electricity	Irving	2002	Electrical utility	P	A
United Supermarkets	Consumer services	Food retailers & wholesalers	Lubbock	1916	Supermarket chain	P	A
USAA	Financials	Property & casualty insurance	San Antonio	1922	Financial services	P	A
Valero Energy	Oil & gas	Integrated oil & gas	San Antonio	1980	Oil and gas	P	A
VALIC	Financials	Life insurance	Houston	1955	Part of American International Group	P	A
Varsity Brands	Consumer goods	Clothing & accessories	Farmers Branch	2014	Owned by Bain Capital	P	A
Visionworks	Health care	Medical supplies	San Antonio	1988	Vision care	P	A
Waste Management	Industrials	Waste & disposal services	Houston	1968	Waste services	P	A
Whataburger	Consumer services	Restaurants & bars	San Antonio	1950	Restaurant chain	P	A
Whole Foods Market	Consumer services	Food retailers & wholesalers	Austin	1980	Supermarket chain	P	A
Woodforest National Bank	Financials	Banks	The Woodlands	1980	Bank	P	A
X Corp.	Technology	Social media	Bastrop	2023	Formerly known as Twitter and formerly headquartered in San Francisco	P	A
XTO Energy	Oil & gas	Exploration & production	Fort Worth	1986	Oil production	P	A
Zale Corporation	Consumer services	Specialty retailers	Irving	1924	Jeweler	P	A

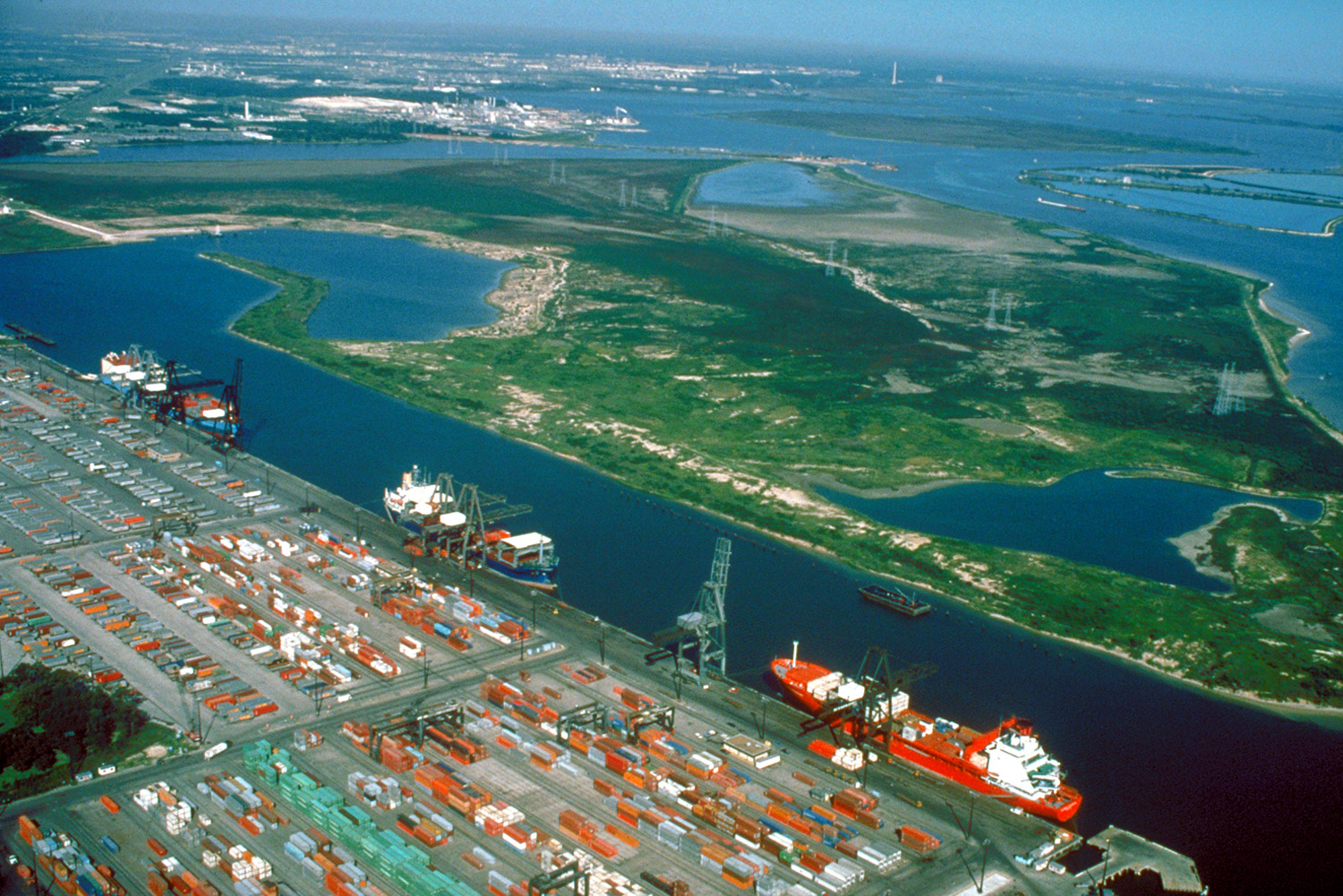
The Houston Ship Channel

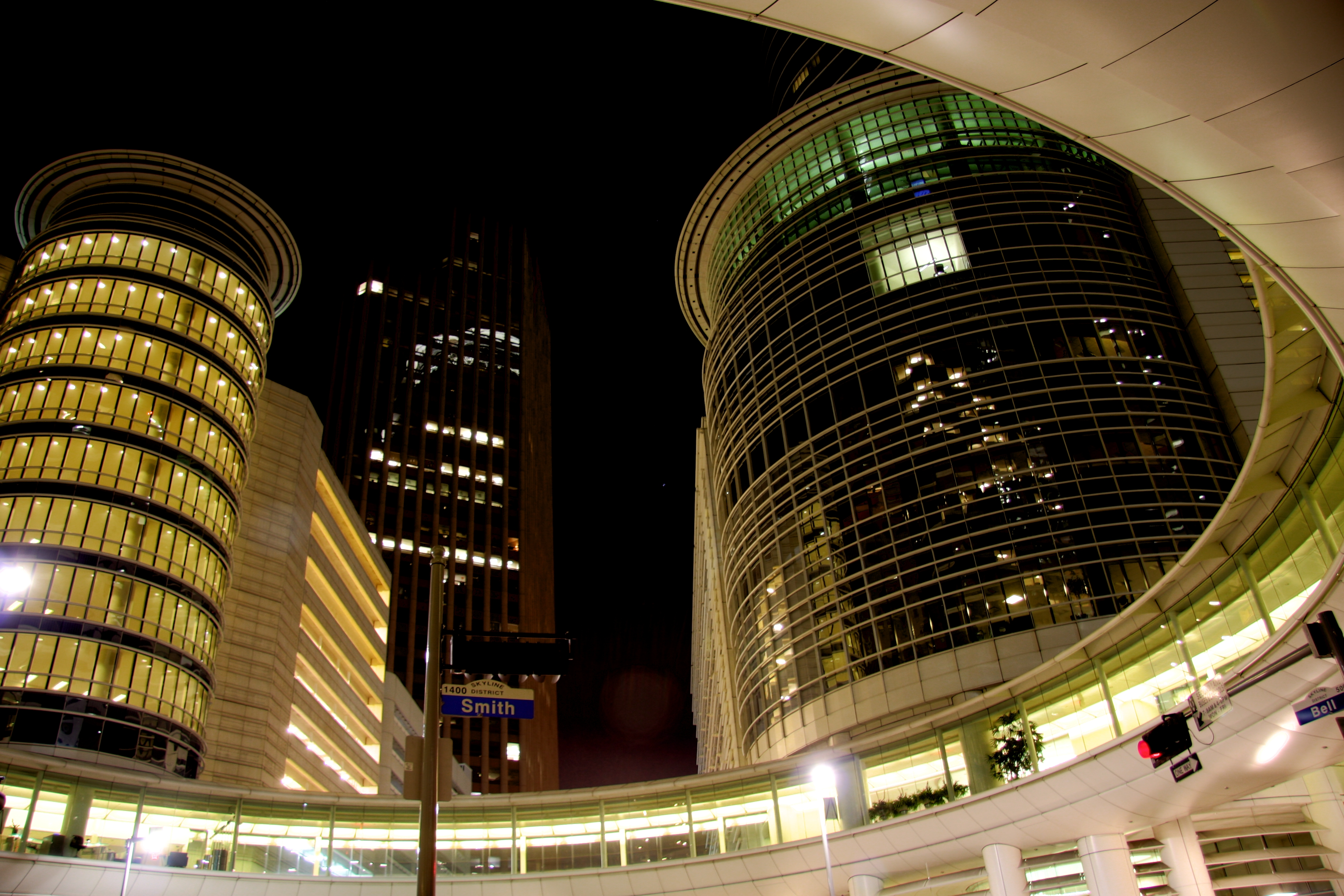
Chevron offices in Houston

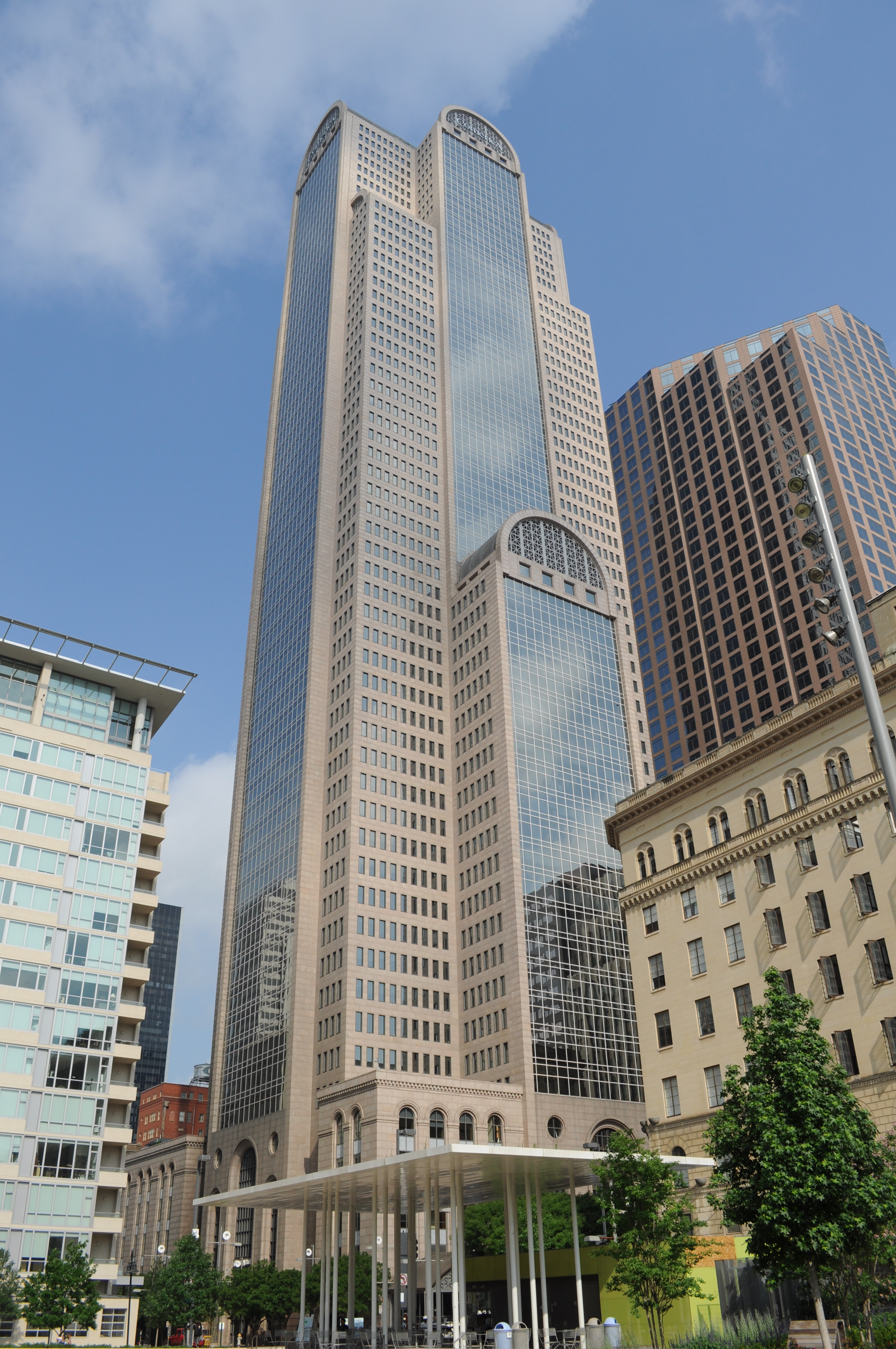
Comerica Bank Tower in downtown Dallas

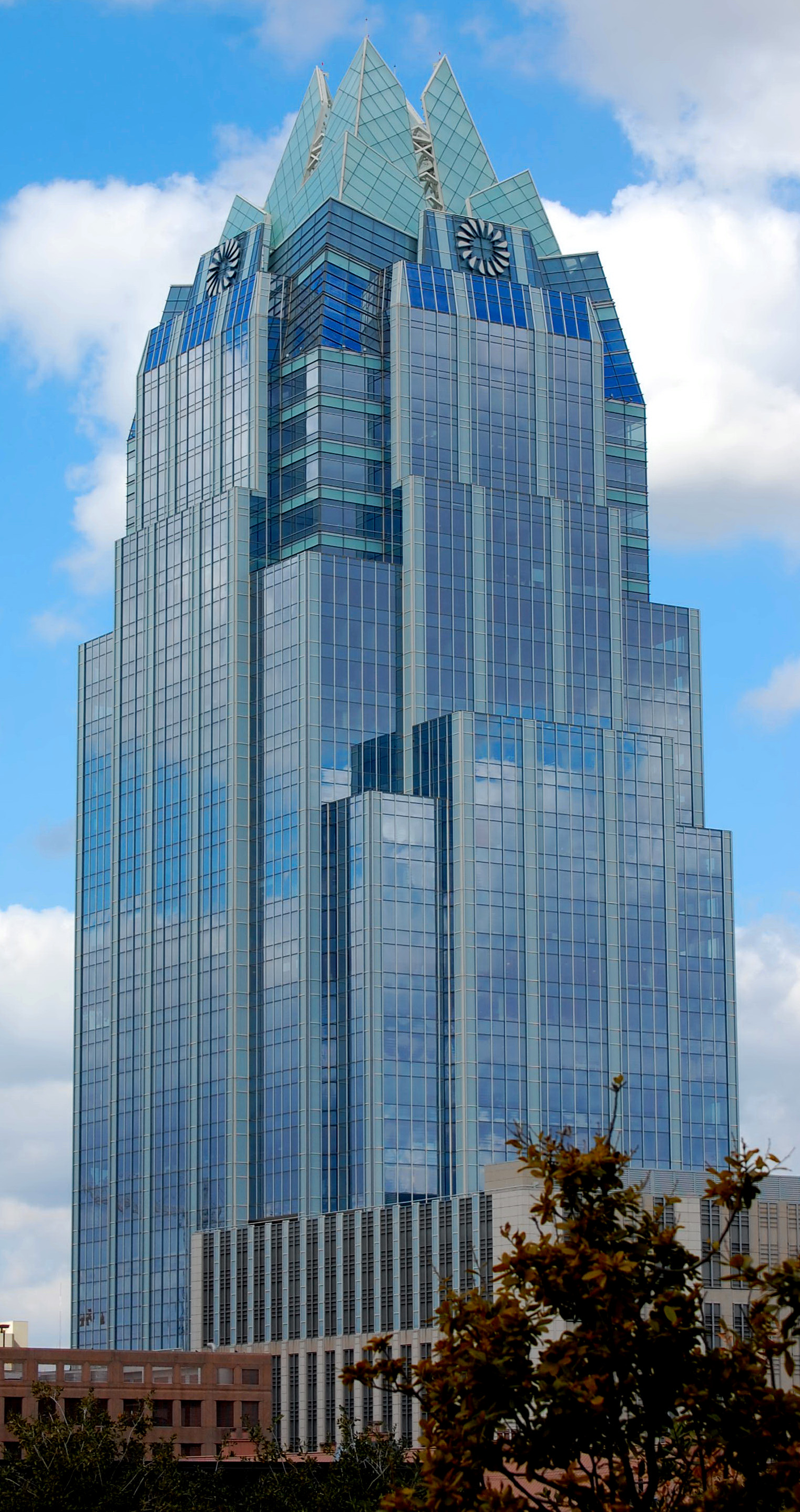
The Frost Bank Tower in Austin, Texas

== See also ==
- List of companies located in Dallas
- List of companies located in the Dallas–Fort Worth metroplex
- List of companies located in Houston
