= Guaranty Bank =

Guaranty Bank may refer to:

- Guaranty Bank (Texas), a defunct bank that operated in Texas and California (1988–2009)
- Guaranty Bank (Wisconsin), a defunct bank that was based in Wisconsin (1923-2017)
- First Guaranty Bank, a Hammond, Louisiana–based bank, established 1934
- Guaranty Bank & Trust, a Mount Pleasant, Texas–based bank, established 1913
- Guaranty Bank and Trust Company (Dallas, Texas), a defunct bank that was based in Dallas, Texas (1920–1988)
