= Broadway Bank =

Broadway Bank may refer to:

- Broadway Bank (Illinois), a defunct bank founded by the Giannoulias family and closed by the FDIC in 2010 with its assets transferred to MB Financial Bank
- Broadway Bank (Texas), a San Antonio bank founded in 1942, also controlling Eisenhower Bank, and still operating
- Broadway Bank and Trust Company, a California bank bought by Orra E. Monnette in 1911 and absorbed into what became Bank of America
- Broadway Bank of Brooklyn, a New York bank absorbed into Manufacturers Trust Company in the early 20th century
