= Altabank =

American bank

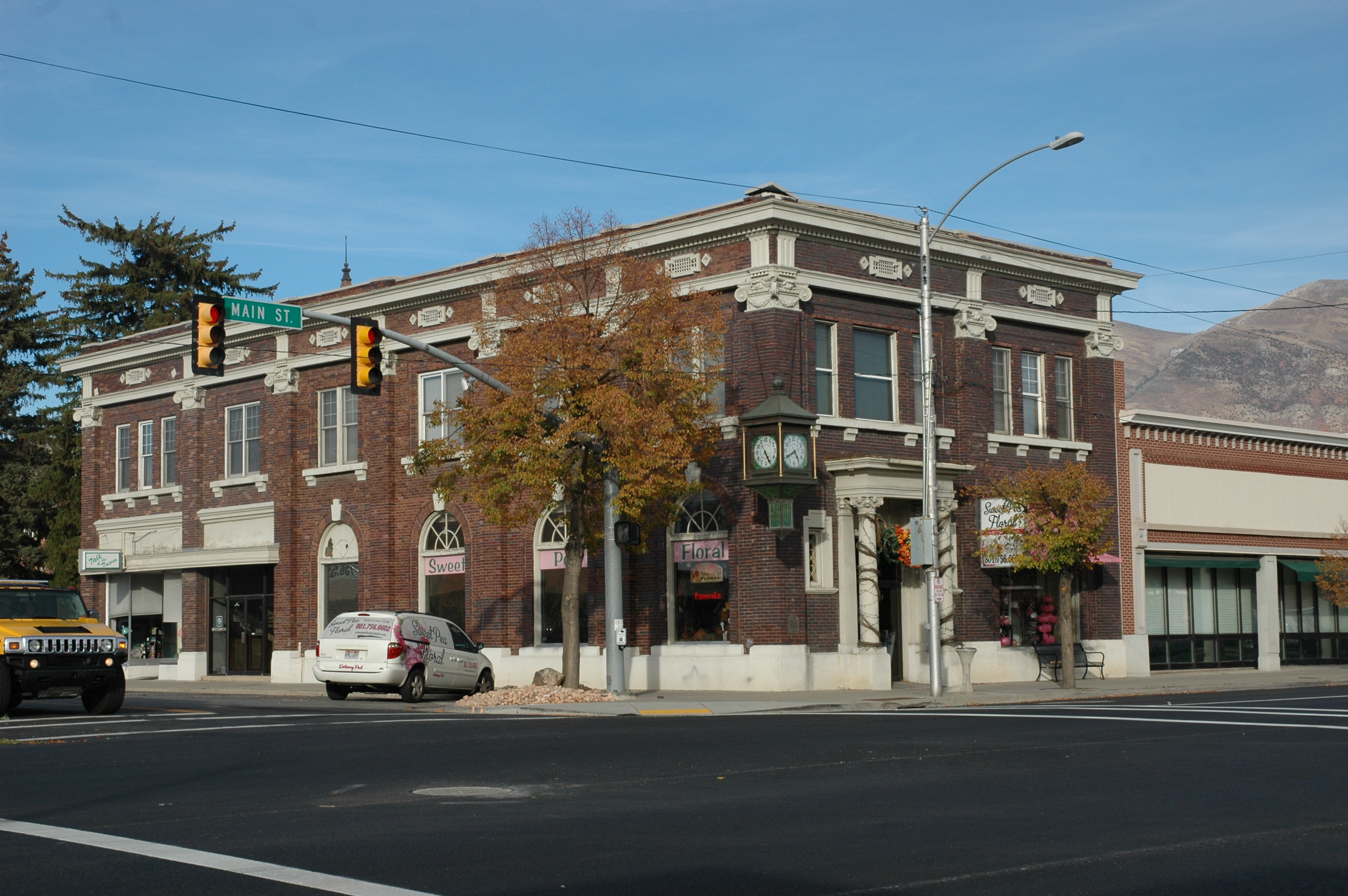
- The historic building in American Fork that once again serves as the bank's headquarters, October 2012
- Formerly: People's Intermountain Bank, Bank of American Fork, Lewiston State Bank, People’s State Bank of American Fork
- Industry: Banking
- Founded: December 1, 1913; 112 years ago
- Headquarters: 33 East Main Street; American Fork, Utah; United States
- Number of locations: 26 (2019)
- Area served: Wasatch Front, St. George, and Cache Valley
- Key people: Deborah Bayle (chairman); Terry Grant (president)
- Products: Financial services
- Number of employees: 520
- Website: www.altabank.com

Altabank is a full-service bank headquartered in American Fork, Utah, United States, that was formerly known as People's Intermountain Bank. Prior to its acquisition by Glacier Bancorp, Altabank was owned by a publicly held holding company, People's Utah Bancorp, and was traded on the NASDAQ. It is the second-largest bank headquartered in Utah, and has 26 branches serving businesses and individuals in the area from Preston, Idaho to St. George, Utah. The current bank was formed from mergers of separate institutions including Bank of American Fork, Lewiston State Bank, and People's State Bank of American Fork These themselves had grown by opening new branches and by acquisitions, including, in the case of Bank of American Fork, by its acquisition of branches from Banner Bank.

== Description ==
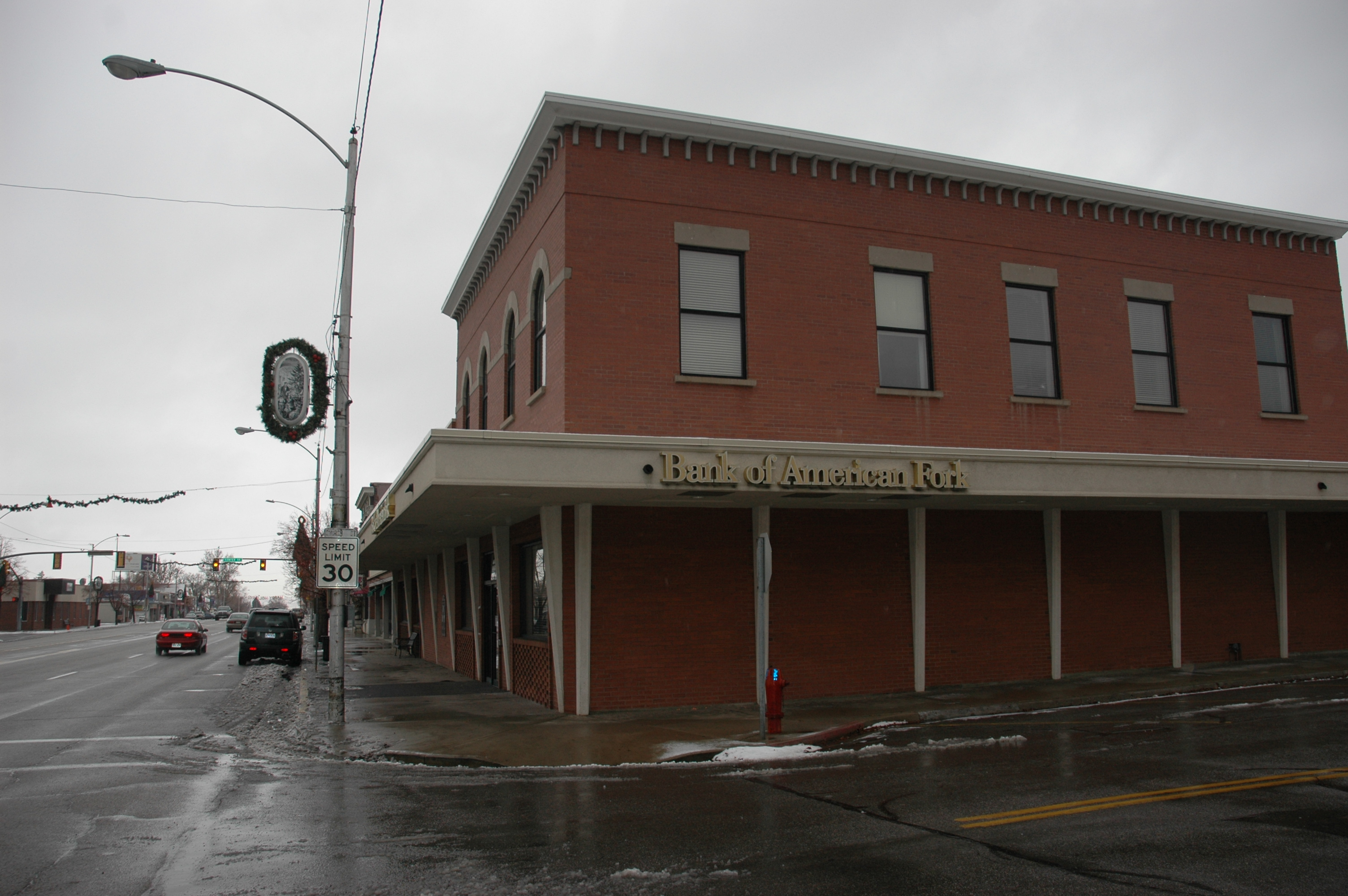
Bank of American Fork branch, near bank's historic headquarters building in American Fork, December 2010

The bank is headquartered in American Fork, but serves the Wasatch Front, the Cache Valley, and St. George with 26 locations, from St. George to Preston, Idaho. As of 2018, the bank employed about 520 people.

Originally called The People's State Bank of American Fork, it officially changed its name to Bank of American Fork in the 1960s. Decades later, the bank purchased and restored a historical building constructed in 1911 and listed on the National Register of Historic Places in 1993. The historic building initially housed the original Bank of American Fork that closed after the 1929 stock market crash. (The bank's historic headquarters building is significant as the only surviving bank building and the "most visually impressive" of four surviving intact historic commercial buildings on Main Street in American Fork.)

== History ==
=== Early years ===
Bank of American Fork was established in 1913 as The People's State Bank of American Fork. In its early years, the bank found modest success servicing mostly sheep farmers in Utah County. Key to the bank's success was the leadership of Clifford E. Young, the Bank's manager from 1913 until the mid-1950s.

After the stock market crash of 1929, the Bank survived with the help of Young and other shareholders who sold and mortgaged their personal property. In early 1932, Young decided to temporarily close People's State Bank instead of risking a run on the bank, as had happened to many banks across the country. The bank re-opened later that year.

Orville Gunther, a local businessman, had been serving on the Bank's board of directors for several years when, in the early 1960s, he purchased a controlling interest in the bank. Soon after, Gunther shortened the name of the bank by dropping "People's State" so that it became known as "Bank of American Fork."

=== 1970s - 2000s ===
Expansion within Utah began in the 1970s when the Bank's second branch was built in Alpine. The 1990s saw full-service branches constructed in Highland, Orem, Lehi, Pleasant Grove, and Spanish Fork. With the new century came new branches in the Salt Lake Valley, including locations in Draper, Sandy, Murray, and Riverton. Later, a Saratoga Springs branch opened in Utah Valley and a Layton branch opened in Davis County, bringing the total number of Bank of American Fork branches to 13. In 2014, Bank of American Fork opened a full-service branch in St. George. As of August 2017, Bank of American Fork had 15 branches. The bank's holding company is People's Utah Bancorp.

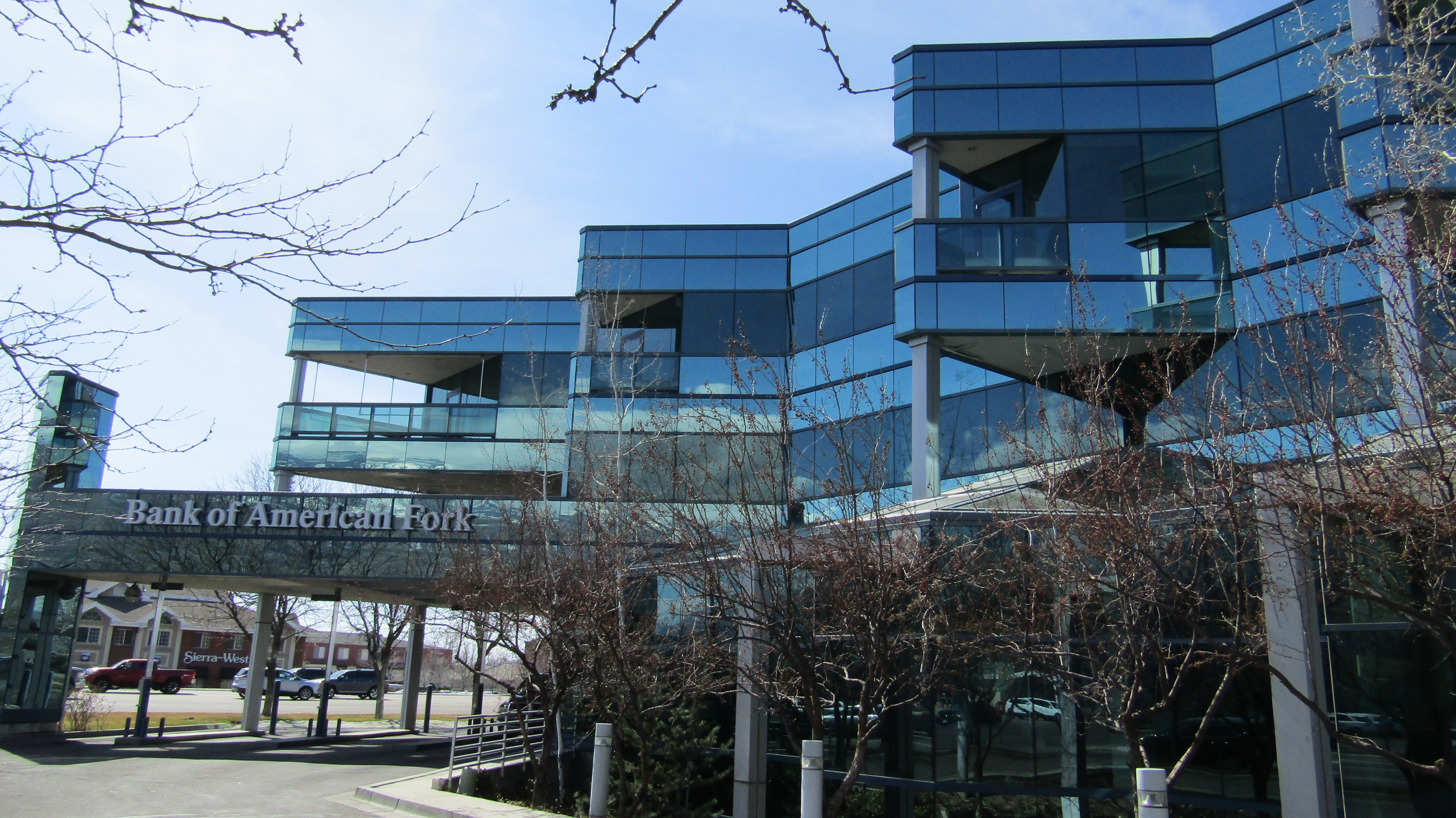
Bank of American Fork branch in southeastern Orem, March 2017

=== 2013 - 2019 ===
In 2013, Bank of American Fork merged with Lewiston State Bank of Logan, Utah. (Lewiston State Bank was founded in Lewiston, Utah in 1905.)

In 2015, Bank of American Fork and Lewiston State Bank merged their banking charters into one, with the existing charter named People's Intermountain Bank. As divisions of People's Intermountain Bank, Bank of American Fork and Lewiston State Bank continue operating under their traditional names and branding.

In June 2017, People's Intermountain Bank announced its intention to purchase Town & Country Bank of St. George. Following regulatory approval and the closing of the transaction, the Bank of American Fork St. George branch was consolidated with the Town & Country Bank St. George location, with the surviving entity operating as People's Town & Country Bank, a division of People's Intermountain Bank.

On July 27, 2017, People's Intermountain Bank announced its intention to acquire Banner Bank's Utah branches. The transaction was completed on October 6, 2017, and the five surviving Banner Bank branches began operating under the name Bank of American Fork on October 9, 2017, bringing the total number of Bank of American Fork branches to 20, and the total number of branches in the People's Intermountain Bank family to 25.

=== 2019 - present ===
On November 13, 2019, the People's Intermountain Bank and its divisions (Bank of American Fork, Lewiston State Bank, and People's Town & Country Bank) rebranded itself as Altabank. In 2021 Altabank was acquired by Glacier Bancorp. In December 2021, Terry Grant was named the next president of Altabank, replacing a retiring Len Williams.
