= Bank of American Fork (building) =

- U.S. National Register of Historic Places
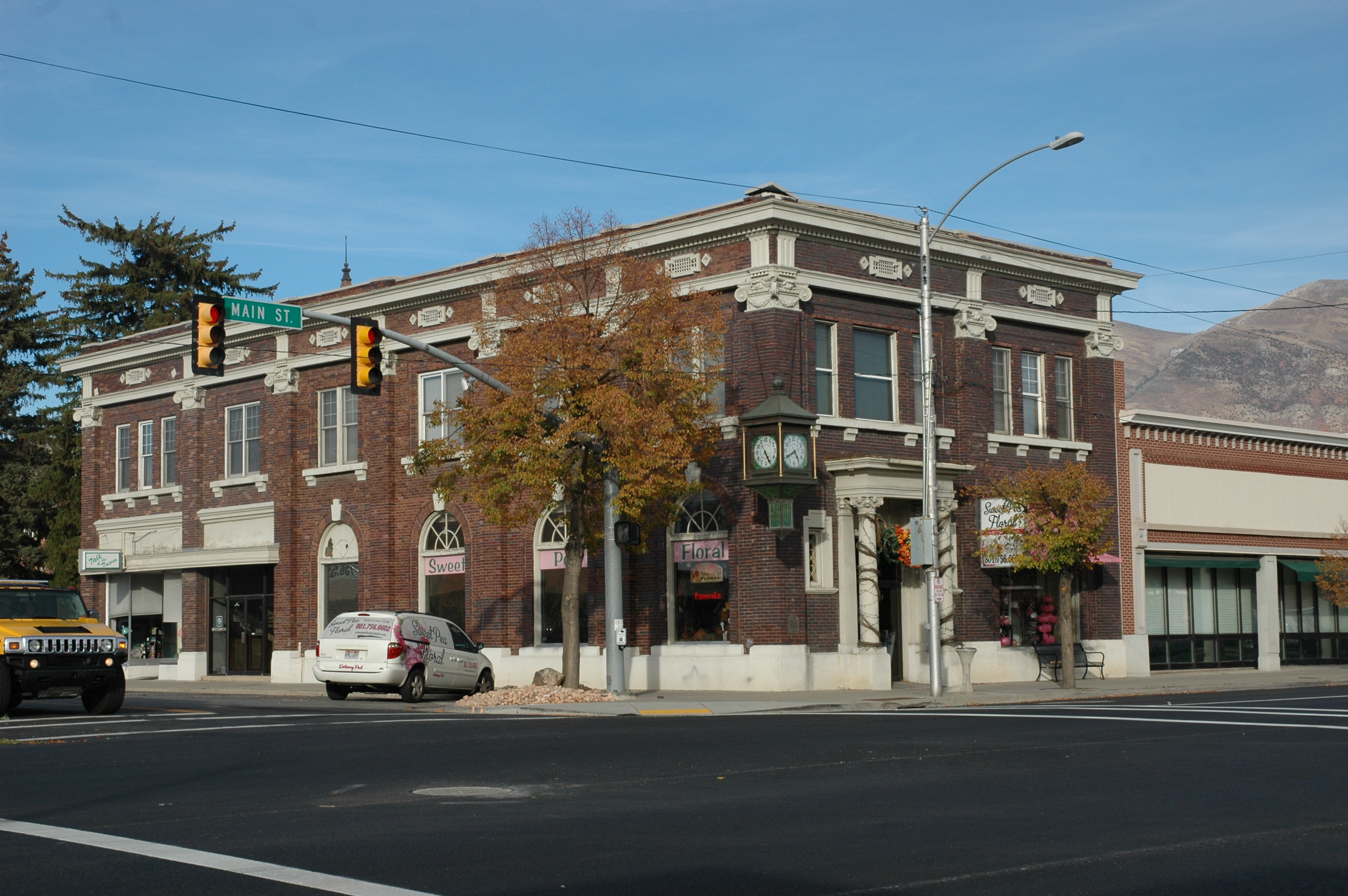
- The historic building, October 2012

- Location within Utah Location within the United States
- Location: 1 East Main Street; American Fork, Utah; United States
- Coordinates: 40°22′37″N 111°47′51″W
- Area: 0.1 acres (0.040 ha)
- Built: 1911
- Architectural style: Classical Revival
- NRHP reference No.: 93000065
- Added to NRHP: March 9, 1993

Bank of American Fork is a historic commercial building in downtown American Fork, Utah, United States, that is listed on the National Register of Historic Places (NRHP) and once again serves as the headquarters of the bank (Altabank) which was formerly known as the Bank of American Fork.

== Description ==
The building is located at 1 East Main Street (US-89) in downtown American Fork. It is significant as the only surviving bank building and the "most visually impressive" of four surviving intact historic commercial buildings on Main Street.

Originally called The People's State Bank of American Fork, it officially changed its name to Bank of American Fork in the 1960s. Bank of American Fork purchased and restored the historical building built in 1911 and was listed on the NRHP March 9, 1993. The historic building originally housed the original Bank of American Fork that closed after the 1929 stock market crash. In 2019, the Bank of American Fork was rebranded as Altabank.

== See also ==
- National Register of Historic Places listings in Utah County, Utah
