= Banner Bank =

Washington-chartered commercial bank

Banner Corporation

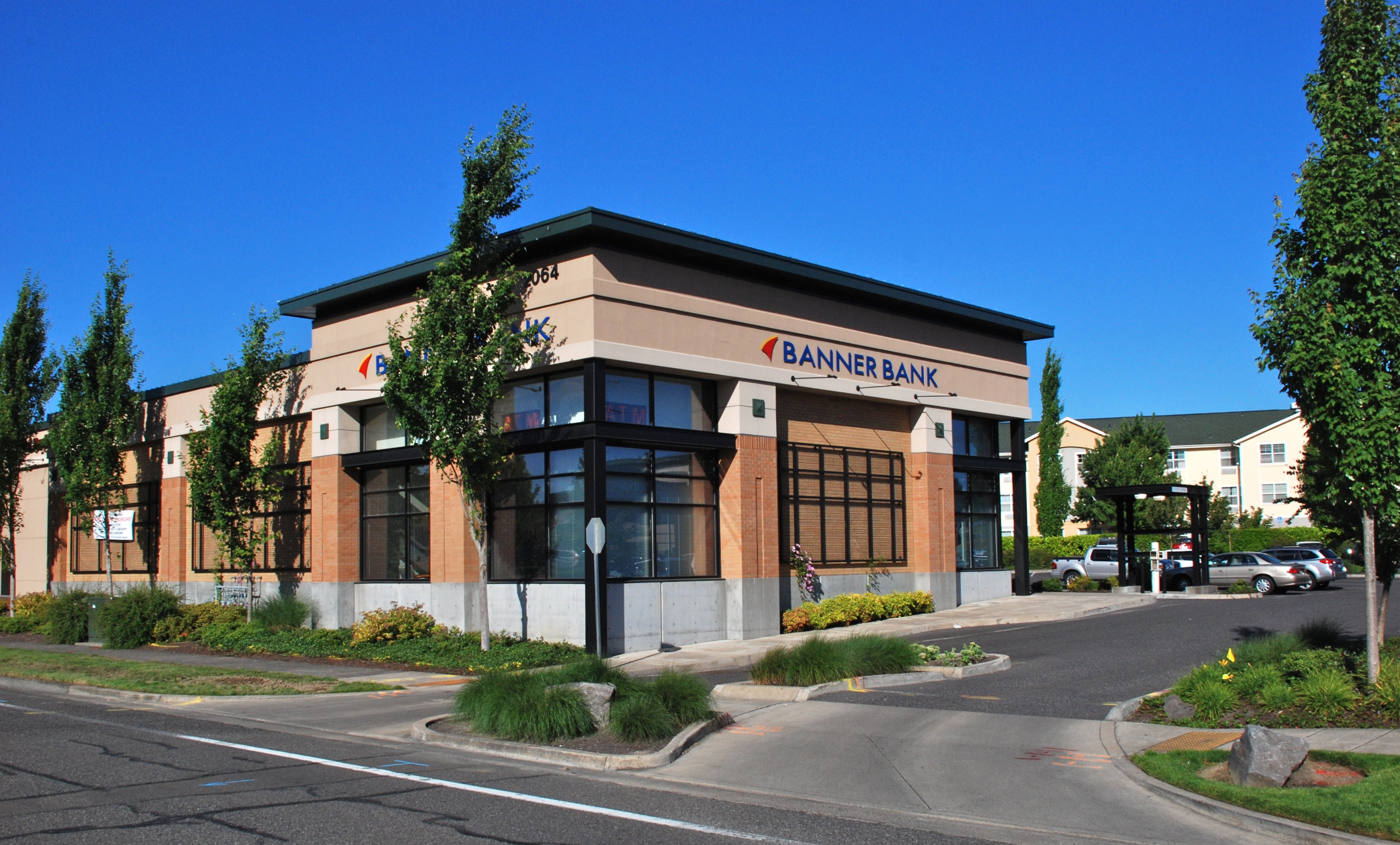
- Banner Bank branch in Hillsboro, Oregon.
- Type: Public
- Traded as: Nasdaq: BANR; S&P 600 Component; Russell 3000
- Industry: Commercial Banks
- Founded: 1890; 136 years ago (as National Building Loan & Trust Association)
- Headquarters: Walla Walla, Washington, United States
- Key people: Mark J. Grescovich (president & CEO)
- Products: Checking accounts; Savings; Commercial banking; Consumer lending; Construction loans; Home loans
- Revenue: ▲US$225M (Q2 2016)
- Net income: US$16.9M (Q1 2020)
- Total assets: US$12.78b (Q1 2020)
- Total equity: US$1.3B (Q2 2016)
- Number of employees: Approximately 2,000

Banner Bank is a Washington-chartered commercial bank. Founded in 1890, it is headquartered in Walla Walla, Washington.

Banner Bank is a member of the Federal Home Loan Bank System and its deposits are insured by the Federal Deposit Insurance Corporation.

Banner Bank is a wholly owned subsidiary of Banner Corporation. Banner Corporation common stock is publicly traded on the NASDAQ Global Market® under the symbol "BANR".

== History ==
The National Building Loan & Trust Association was founded in Walla Walla, Washington in 1890. In October 2000, the bank changed its name to Banner Corp and announced its 38 branches would all operate as Banner Bank. Previously, the Washington and Idaho branches had operated under separate brands such as First Savings Bank, Whatcom State Bank, Seaport Citizens Bank and Towne Bank.

In 2010, Mark J. Grescovich was named president of Banner Corporation and Banner Bank. A few months later, Banner Corp sold 75 million of its shares to raise capital.

Banner Bank acquired Islanders Bank of San Juan County in December 2006, F&M Bank of Spokane Valley (14 branches) in May 2007, NCW Community Bank of Wenatchee in October 2007, Siuslaw Bank of Florence, Oregon (10 branches) in March 2015, AmericanWest Bank of Spokane (105 branches, including in Utah and California) in October 2015, Skagit Bank of Burlington in November 2018, AltaPacific Bank in Santa Rosa in Q4 of 2019.

In October 2017, Banner Bank sold all of its seven Utah branches to Bank of American Fork (now Altabank).
