= Spira (footwear company) =

American footwear manufacturer

Spira Footwear Inc.
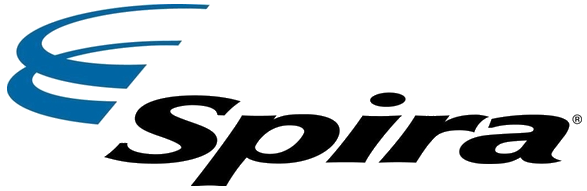
- Company type: Private
- Industry: Apparel
- Founded: 2002; 24 years ago
- Founder: Andy Krafsur
- Fate: Purchased by Private Company in 2016
- Headquarters: Los Angeles, CA, United States
- Area served: Worldwide
- Products: Athletic footwear
- Website: spira.com

Spira Footwear Inc., best known as simply Spira, is an American footwear manufacturer founded in El Paso, Texas, and currently based out of Los Angeles, CA. It was founded in 2001 by Andy Krafsur and is best known for their running, walking, and casual shoes with springs embedded under the heel and toe cushion.

Spira Footwear closed in early 2016 with an undisclosed company purchasing Spira's assets, including patents, trademarks, and inventory of unsold running shoes. Since its purchase, the company continues to produce, market, and sell Spira products on their website and various retailers.

== Marketing ==
=== A&E Networks relationship ===
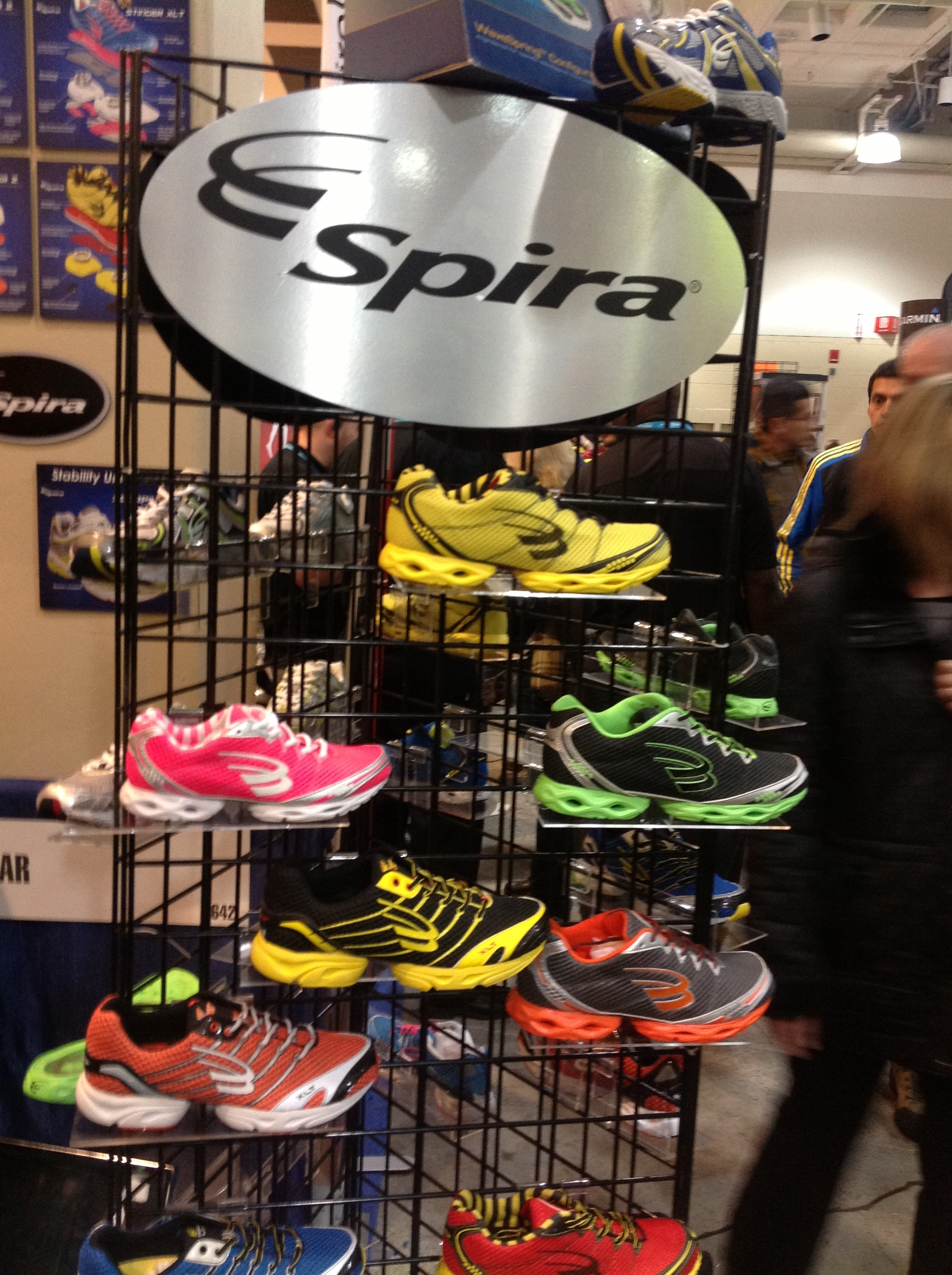
A Spira shoe display at the 2013 Boston Marathon Expo

In the spring of 2013, Spira was selected to be featured as part of the A&E Networks Project Startup, and initiative with the crowdfunding site RocketHub to raise capital for a new lightweight running shoe. This initiative is part of A&E's "Real Life, Real Change" social campaign that showcases innovative companies through TV vignettes on the network as well as a web presence for Spira on A&E's website and social media extensions.

Spira raised more than $42,000 by pre-selling more than 800 pairs of the Stinger 2 shoes to supporter and enthusiasts through the RocketHub platform. The money was used to fund the purchase the initial run of inventory for the new shoe.

In August 2013, Spira announced a line of officially licensed limited edition Duck Dynasty camouflage shoes. The company will introduce a running shoe that will feature the signature duck camouflage pattern sported by the Robertson family, who are the stars of the reality television series.

The relationship between A&E, RocketHub, and Spira Footwear started in the summer of 2012 when Spira used Rockethub’s service to crowdfund its line of Stinger2 shoes. With a crowdfunding project under their belt, Spira was chosen by A&E to align with after the network brainstormed the idea to launch a shoe line for Duck Dynasty. Using the crowdfunding site gives Spira the opportunity to pre-sell the shoe allowing the company to anticipate demand and to determine proper inventory levels. This gives Spira increased visibility into the demand for the shoe so this smaller company can anticipate manufacturing needs with greater accuracy.

=== HealthWagers contest ===
In May 2013, Spira and HealthWagers announced a contest where a runner, who is wearing Spira shoes, completes a sanctioned chip-timed race, and the runner does not run faster than their personal record, Spira will pay them back for the price of their shoes. According to the rules of the contest, the race must be longer than 10 kilometres (6.2 mi) and must completed in the foreseeable future.

== Research ==
In 2014, the Northern Alberta Institute of Technology conducted a research study on the impact of the Spira shoes and technology on running efficiency. The study used 17 runners to compare treadmill performance of two Spira models, one for training and the other for racing, to their own shoes. The study measured oxygen consumption and heart rate at a pace of 11 kilometres (6.8 mi) per hour to determine the energy output of each runner.

The study concluded the average person running a marathon could cut four minutes from their run time over the 26.2 miles (42.2 km) distance.

== Controversy ==
Spira claimed that their shoes were banned from races because they purportedly did not conform to International Association of Athletics Federations and USA Track and Field standards. The company has offered a million US dollar bounty to two Kenyans if they win the 2006 Boston Marathon wearing Spira's product. In spite of this, USATF confirmed in 2007 that the shoes aren't banned: "Because of pending litigation, USATF cannot comment on Spira shoes beyond confirming that USATF has not examined or 'banned' the shoe, as we have publicly stated multiple times over the last year-plus."

At 2008 Summer Olympics in Beijing, China, at least three athletes used Spira shoes in competition. Axel Zeebroek used racing flats in the running portion of the triathlon and Franklin Tenorio of Ecuador and Joao N'Tyamba of Angola both ran the marathon using Spira shoes.

== See also ==
- List of Texas companies
