= Gutterth =

- Founded: 2006
- Location: Denton, Texas
- Official website: gutterth.bandcamp.com

Gutterth is a Denton-based production company founded by Michael Briggs and Brent Frishman as an attempt to promote live music and art. Gutterth is well known for its promotion of and its involvement in the Dallas/Fort Worth music scene, and it has been nominated for multiple Dallas Observer Music Awards.

== Gutterth Live ==
Gutterth began hosting shows in 2006, its first featuring the pAper chAse in an acoustic performance. This show's success allowed Gutterth to continue hosting events. After the third concert, Gutterth began calling these events Episodes. Although their shows consist primarily of Episodes, Gutterth has hosted many other concerts and CD releases as well.

In addition to smaller local bands, Gutterth has hosted shows that have featured more recognized Dallas/Fort Worth bands such as Fair to Midland, the pAper chAse, Mount Righteous, Sarah Jaffe, and Chris Flemmons (of Baptist Generals).

Gutterth hosted one of the premiere showcases at 35 Conferette in both 2010 and 2011. The showcase featured local bands both signed and unsigned to the record label.

== Gutterth Records ==
Gutterth Records was officially launched on September 23, 2006 with the release of Daniel Folmer's album 'Wear Headphones' (GR001). They have since released several more albums, the latest of which is the New Science Projects album entitled 'Bikini Salute' (GR022), which was released on January 22, 2010.

GutterthRecords.com was officially launched on May 10, 2010. It features a comprehensive discography of the label's releases as well as the option to listen to the albums online for free. Listeners have the opportunity to buy any of the songs or albums with a name-your-own-price system with set minimum prices.

Along with being nominated for two consecutive years, in 2010 Gutterth was nominated for four Dallas Observer Music Awards under the categories of Best Record Label, Best Booking Agent, Best Music Advocate, and Best Radio Show/Podcast. Also, several artists that Gutterth has worked with (as well as a few of the label's bands) were nominated (and won) in various categories.

In 2013 Gutterth Records was named one of the "Top 10 Best Record Labels in Dallas."

== Signed Bands ==
Bands/artists currently or formerly signed under the Gutterth label include:

- Ryan Thomas Becker
- Daniel Folmer
- The Timeline Post
- New Science Projects
- Two Knights
- MALISE
- Sean Kirkpatrick
- Parata
- Dirty Water Disease
- The Heartstring Stranglers
- Ourselves
- Dear Human
- Star Commander

== Compilations ==
To date, Gutterth has released three compilations. They are a collection of music by artists that the record label has worked with in any way, whether it was helping record or hosting shows. They are all currently available for download on their website.

== Podcasts ==
On March 2, 2009, Gutterth released their first iTunes Podcast. In the Podcasts, songs from local bands are played, and a featured artist is interviewed, followed by playing a live set of in-studio songs. The label has continued to periodically release podcasts, each one featuring a new local artist.
