= Fred Loya Insurance =

American car insurance company

Fred Loya Insurance Company
- Industry: Insurance
- Founded: El Paso, Texas, U.S. (1974)
- Founder: Fred Loya
- Headquarters: El Paso, Texas, U.S.
- Number of locations: 700 agencies
- Area served: California, Colorado, Illinois, Indiana, Nevada, New Mexico, Texas, Georgia, Alabama, Arizona, Ohio
- Key people: Fred Loya, President & CEO
- Products: Auto insurance
- Revenue: ▲US$506.3 million (2012)
- Number of employees: 5,200 (2015)
- Website: fredloya.com

Fred Loya Insurance is a Texas based Hispanic 500 car insurance company. As of 2016 the company had 5,200 employees and 700 offices in Alabama, Arizona, California, Colorado, Georgia, Illinois, Indiana, New Mexico, Nevada, Ohio and Texas. It is the 18th largest Latino-owned company in the country.

The company is headquartered in El Paso, Texas and owned by Fred Loya, a Latin American. Loya began selling insurance in 1974. In 2008 Loya consolidated three San Antonio claims centers into one.

== History and current company structure ==
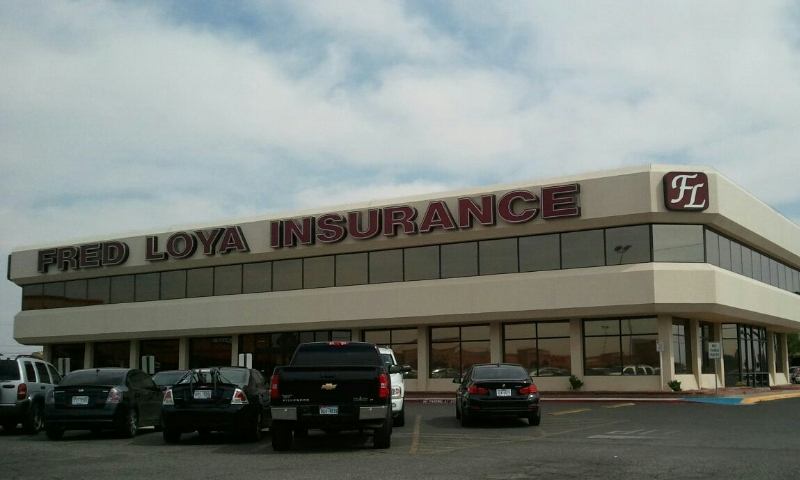
Fred Loya Insurance Corporate Office

Fred Loya started Loya Insurance Group in 1974 in El Paso, Texas. It began as a single store front office and has since expanded to more than 361 agencies across six states California, Colorado, Illinois, New Mexico, Nevada and Texas.

The Loya Insurance Group agencies are located in multiple types of locations such as shopping centers, grocery stores, street corners, and office buildings. The agencies are in both small and large towns and cities and focus on being in places where the lower income people go on a regular basis.

=== Small Business Stimulus Campaign ===
Fred Loya Insurance has launched a small business incentive program in which it will choose to grant $5,000 per week for a small business in the El Paso area.

== Locations ==
Some places that the agencies are located include:

- Wal-Mart Supercenters
- Fiesta Marts
- Big 8 Food Source stores
- Liborio Supermarkets
- Fiesta Whole Food
- Superior
- Cardenas
- Northgate Market

== Leadership ==
- Fred Loya Sr. - Chairman Emeritus
- Fred Loya Jr. - Chief Executive Officer
- Flower Loya - President
- Ben Salazar - Chief Operating Officer
- Joe Ramirez - Chief Financial Officer
- Edgar Fiol - Executive Sales Director
- Edgar Meza - Vice President of Claims Department
- George Briones - Director of Information and Technology
- Lana Ruiz - Senior Underwriter
- Leah Williams - Data Analyst

== Fines and lawsuits ==
In 2012 Loya was fined $300,000 for violating state insurance laws in Texas after insurance regulators determined the auto insurance company used false advertising, and did not follow the company's filed criteria for policy discounts to customers.

A proposed class-action lawsuit has been filed against Fred Loya Insurance Agency, and Loya Casualty Insurance Company. In this lawsuit, Plaintiffs contend that Loya did not comply with the requirements under California law for payment of wages. If successful, a class action allows former and current employees to receive back wages that are owed to them.
