= Synergyst Research =

- Company type: private
- Industry: clinical research
- Founded: San Antonio, Texas (January 1, 2006)
- Founder: Dr. Alan Preston
- Headquarters: San Antonio, Texas
- Area served: Texas, Florida
- Key people: Trudy Madan (President); Sheri Chandler (VP)
- Services: management
- Number of employees: 100+
- Subsidiaries: Discovery Clinical Trials
- Website: synergystresearch.net

Synergyst Research is a privately owned American company that partners physicians with pharmaceutical companies to conduct clinical research. Its subsidiary, Discovery Clinical Trials, was founded in 2008.

== Overview ==
Synergyst Research was founded in 2006 in San Antonio, Texas by Trudy Madan. Physicians work with Synergyst Research on studies that fit their specialties and practices. Synergyst Research also works with various biotech, pharmaceutical and medical device companies, such as Pfizer and AstraZeneca, to conduct clinical research. Unlike competitors, as of 2007 the company claims it allows physicians to have control over the patients' participation in trials, as compared to a third party.

In October 2007 they announced an expansion to Houston, Texas, expanding that November to Florida, chiefly Jacksonville, Miami, and Orlando. By that time they had partnered with United Sleep Diagnostics and MedEye Associates in South Florida.

In December 2008 the San Antonio Business Journal named president and CEO Trudy Madan one of its "40 under 40 Rising Stars" of the year.

Synergyst Research launched a spin-off company, Discovery Clinical Trials, in 2009. The company helps Synergyst clients develop and manage new research departments. In November 2012 the two companies combined were named for a second year in a row on the 5000 List of "America's Fastest-Growing Private Companies," ranking No. 145 among Health Companies and No. 1,838 overall.
