= Guaranty Bank & Trust =

American bank based in Texas

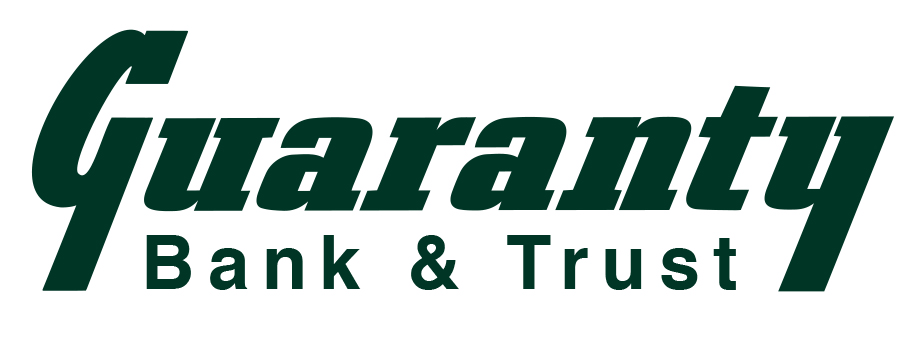
- Type: Public company
- Traded as: NYSE: GNTY; Russell 2000 Component
- Founded: January 1913; 113 years ago in Mount Pleasant, Texas
- Headquarters: Addison, Texas, United States
- Number of locations: 33 branches
- Area served: Texas
- Key people: Ty Abston (President, CEO, and Chairman of the Board)
- Total assets: US$ 3.2 billion (December 2023)
- Number of employees: 412 (2016)
- Parent: Glacier Bancorp
- Website: gnty.com

Guaranty Bank & Trust is a Texas-based commercial bank that offers personal and business banking services.

Headquartered in Addison, Texas, it was founded in 1913 and was a subsidiary of Guaranty Bancshares until 2025, when its parent company was sold to Glacier Bancorp, Inc. Tyson Abston serves as President, CEO and chairman of both Guaranty Bank & Trust (GBT) and Guaranty Bancshares.

The firm has branches in Bryan, Paris, Texarkana, Sulphur Springs, Bogata, Commerce, Pittsburg, New Boston, Mount Pleasant, Mount Vernon, Longview, Hallsville, College Station, Royse City, Denton, Houston, Conroe, Katy, Austin, Fort Worth, Rockwall, Dallas and Georgetown.

== History ==
The Texas Department of Banking issued a charter to Guaranty State Bank on January 20, 1913. The bank's name changed to Guaranty Bond State Bank in 1927.

In 1980, a year after adding trust powers, it created Guaranty Bancshares Inc. (GBI) and made it its holding company; the following year, the bank changed its name to Guaranty Bank. In 2002, it changed its name from Guaranty Bank to Guaranty Bond Bank.

In 2014, the bank changed its name from Guaranty Bond Bank to Guaranty Bank & Trust. The bank was ranked 15th best bank to work for in the United States by American Banker in 2016.

=== Ownership ===
From its founding in 1913 until 1998, GBT was a privately held company. Its parent company, Guaranty Bancshares, became listed under the symbol "GNTY" on the NASDAQ Exchange in 1998.

In June 2005, GBI de-listed from the Nasdaq exchange and again became a privately held company. In May 2017, GBI underwent an IPO and was again listed on the NASDAQ Exchange under the "GNTY" symbol.

In March 2023, Guaranty Bancshares Inc. transferred their listing to NYSE under the "GNTY" symbol.

In October 2025, GBT reported that its parent company had been acquired by Glacier Bancorp and that it would operate as a division of the new owner.

=== Locations ===
In April 1994, the first location in Paris, Texas, opened. Guaranty Bank & Trust also opened its second Mount Pleasant location in 1996. The bank opened a full-service location in Texarkana in 1997. In April 1999, Guaranty opened a location in Pittsburg, Texas.

Guaranty Bank & Trust opened a loan production office in August 2000 in Fort Stockton, Texas. The Fort Stockton location became a full-service bank in December of that same year. In March 2004, Guaranty Bank & Trust opened a location in Mount Vernon, Texas. In August 2004, the Deport location was closed, with customers transferred to nearby towns' branches. A second Texarkana location opened in July that same year. In 2008, Guaranty Bank & Trust closed its Talco location. The following year, it opened a location in New Boston, Texas. In 2010, Guaranty Bank & Trust added both a mobile bank and another full-service branch in Texarkana.

A location was opened in Atlanta, Texas in May 2011. In April 2013, Guaranty Bank & Trust opened its second Paris, Texas location. New locations were added in Longview and College Station in 2013. In June 2014, a location was opened in Bryan, TX. In 2015, a location was added in Royce City, Texas, as part of the acquisition of Texas Leadership Bank. Two more locations were added in the North Dallas area as part of the 2015 acquisition of Preston State Bank. Additionally, in 2015 Guaranty Bank opened a location in Rockwall.

In May 2016, the bank opened a new location in Denton, Texas. Guaranty Bank & Trust announced an additional College Station location in June 2016 before acquiring a second Denton location from Independent Bank in August.

The bank opened an additional location in Austin in November 2017 and an additional location in Fort Worth in January 2018. In 2021 and 2022 Guaranty opened locations Georgetown, Texas Austin, Texas

=== Acquisitions ===
In 1992, Guaranty Bank & Trust acquired the First National Bank of Deport, with branches in both Deport, Texas and Paris, Texas. The company purchased a commercial bank in Bogata, Texas in 1993. Talco State Bank, chartered in 1912, merged with Guaranty Bank & Trust in 1997.

In 1999, Guaranty Bank & Trust acquired First American Financial Corporation, with its Sulphur Springs and Commerce, Texas locations, and wholly owned mortgage company. The renamed Guaranty Mortgage Company was folded into the bank in 2000.

In 2011, the Fort Stockton location was sold to West Texas State Bank. First State Bank of Hallsville, Texas merged with Guaranty Bank & Trust in August 2013. Guaranty Bancshares acquired DCB Financial in 2015.

In 2015, Guaranty Bank & Trust acquired Preston State Bank, a subsidiary of DCB Financial Corp. Texas Leadership Bank was also acquired and its operations merged into Guaranty Bank & Trust in 2015.

On June 1, 2018, Guaranty Bank & Trust acquired Westbound Bank, N.A. of Katy, TX, facilitating entrance into the Houston, TX region.
