= Setcom Corporation =

American emergency equipment developer

- Type: Private
- Industry: Two-way radio
- Founded: 1970
- Headquarters: Austin, Texas

Setcom Corporation is an American manufacturer of communications equipment for police motorcycle officers, firefighters, rescue personnel and industrial users. Setcom supplies public safety professionals in all fifty states, most major US cities, and more than twenty countries with communications equipment.

== History ==
Founded in 1970, Setcom was created from an existing industrial headset division at the San Jose Steel Company in San Jose, California. The founder, Kent Schwartzman, established the company as Comset and moved it to Santa Clara, California where the name was later changed to Setcom. With the new name in place, in 1975 the company moved to its new home in Mountain View, California where it operated for 33 years.

After 34 years of owning and managing Setcom, in 2004 Schwartzman retired and sold the company to an investment company, Pinnacle Peak Capital Partners. With the new ownership, Setcom began a new age of innovation for police motorcycle communications by developing a new generation of wireless advanced communication equipment for police motorcycles and fire apparatus.

Wanting to be more central and accessible to their clientele, in the latter half of 2008 the company began to make to the move to what would become its new home. Austin, Texas was chosen as the official new home for Setcom and on January 5, 2009, it began operating out of the new headquarters.

In September 2011, Setcom continued its growth in the specialty vehicle communications market when it acquired Piratecom. Piratecom was founded in 2005 with the goal of designing communications gear for watercraft. Its products have been put on vessels that range from airboats to fire boats to tugboats to go-fast boats to rescue boats to patrol boats. In particular, numerous municipalities, counties, states, and federal agencies have standardized on Piratecom systems for their marine fleets. By the end of 2011, all of Piratecom's operations will be consolidated into Setcom's Austin manufacturing facility in Austin.

== Police Motorcycle Communication ==
In 1970, the same year the company was formed, Setcom developed and introduced the first communications kit for police motorcycle officers. This revolutionized and set the standard for the world of police motorcycle communications by creating a safer riding environment for officers and allowing them to communicate with their station. Following the invention of the communication kit, in the 1980s they integrated mobile and portable radios for motor officers, creating an easier communication process and offering a wider range of radio configuration options for motor officers. Continuing to improve those methods, the 1990s brought the Eliminator, a portable radio adapter that connects the radio to Setcom's ComKit. Not only did the adapter take away the need for the cumbersome belt box worn by the officers, it allowed greater mobility for officers on and off the bike.

=== Introduction of Wireless Communications ===
The new millennium brought the next big development for Setcom, the creation of the SuperMic. Not only did this development introduce a sleeker version of the typical police shoulder-microphone, it was a safer alternative, designed to auto-sync and move with the officer as multiple duties were performed. After its introduction in 2002 the SuperMic became one of the most popular communication devices used by motor officers throughout the US. Wireless communication for motor officers came about in the early 2000s and in 2005 Setcom launched the Liberator Wireless system. Converting to this wireless system allowed motor officers with a portable radio to take away the cable connecting them to their motorcycle, creating a much safer riding environment. New features such as waterproofing and sidetone, a feature allowing users to hear their own voice transmissions especially when travelling at high speeds, were continually added to the Liberator system to make it safer and easier to use. 2009 brought the launch of Setcom's new wireless system, the Liberator Wireless for mobile-portable radios. This system seamlessly allowed for rapid transition from using the mobile radio while on the motorcycle to using the portable radio while off the motorcycle.

== Fire Communications ==
Setcom began making portable radio headsets for firefighters in the 1970s just as it had created the police motorcycle communications kit. Though they started making the headsets early on, they didn't fully step onto the fire communications scene until the late 1980s and early 1990s when they introduced their first intercom system built for fire apparatus, the System 900. Throughout the 1990s, Setcom released new versions of their intercom system, with upgrades for ease of use for the multitasking firefighters. In 1994, the System 1300 intercom was designed for Aircraft Rescue and Firefighting vehicles (ARFF) that had the first ever split audio function available on the market. The System 1300 intercom went on to become the industry standard for U.S. airports to have on their trucks because of the practicality and safety factors. In 2000, the System 1600 was introduced. Similar to the System 1300, but instead of two radios, it has the capability to interface six. Improvements to fire industry communications have continued into the present with multiple developments including wireless applications, multi-interfacing capabilities, and more. Setcom redesigned two of their intercom systems for greater functionality and with additional features as well as introduced a wireless headset application. With these advancements, they continue to stay at the forefront of communications for fire apparatus and ARFF vehicles.

== Applications ==
=== Setcom at Three Mile Island ===
The Three Mile Island accident is considered the worst nuclear emergency to take place on U.S soil. In the aftermath of the accident, technicians were called upon to enter the Unit 2 Reactor Building, ground zero, in order to assess the damage caused by this horrific catastrophe. Because of the implications of the radioactive

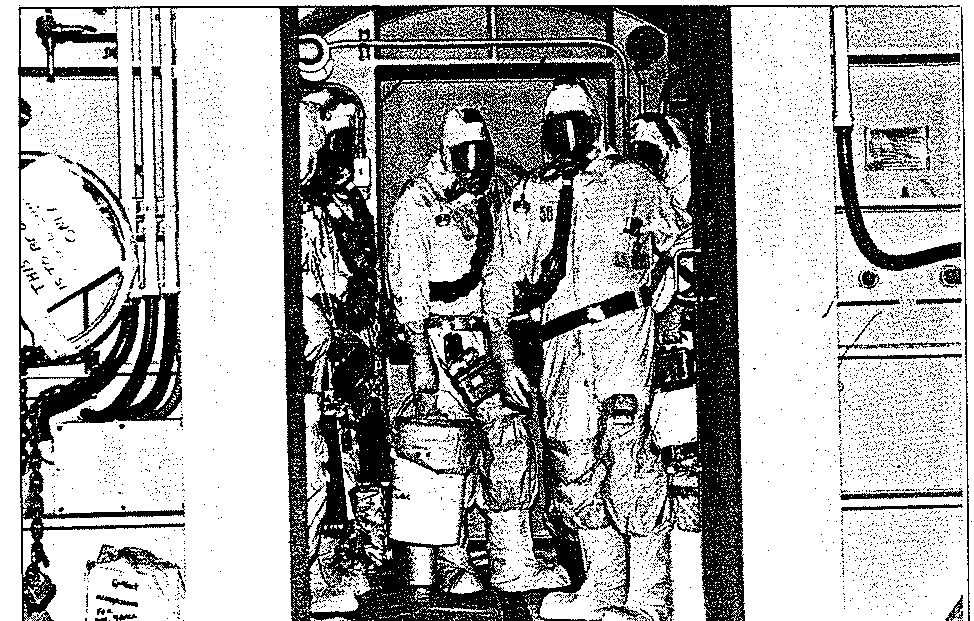
Technicians enter the Unit 2 Reactor Building.

environment, the techs had to wear full-coverage protective clothing and gloves which called for specialized communication equipment. Each person was equipped with a Setcom GM-312 Face Mask Kit and a Setcom Portable radio cable assembly to interface the kit to a Motorola MX series radio worn on a belt. The Setcom Kit included a bone conduction microphone, a unique device designed to respond to voice vibrations transmitted through the skull. Since this microphone was not in the facial portion of the face mask, mask integrity was maintained. This specialized application made it possible for all communications to be recorded and studied to further the investigation into why there was an accident and how much damage it had caused.

== See also ==
- Police Motorcycle
- Motor officer training
- Harley-Davidson
- Two-Way radio
- Firefighters
- Public Safety
- ARFF Vehicles
