= Guaranty Bank (Wisconsin) =

Bank based in Wisconsin, U.S.

- Industry: Banking
- Founded: January 1, 1923; 103 years ago as Guaranty Savings and Loan Association in Milwaukee
- Defunct: May 5, 2017; 9 years ago
- Fate: Bank failure; assets acquired by First Citizens BancShares
- Successor: First Citizens BancShares
- Headquarters: Milwaukee, Wisconsin
- Number of locations: 119 (2017)
- Area served: Wisconsin, Illinois, Michigan, Minnesota, Georgia

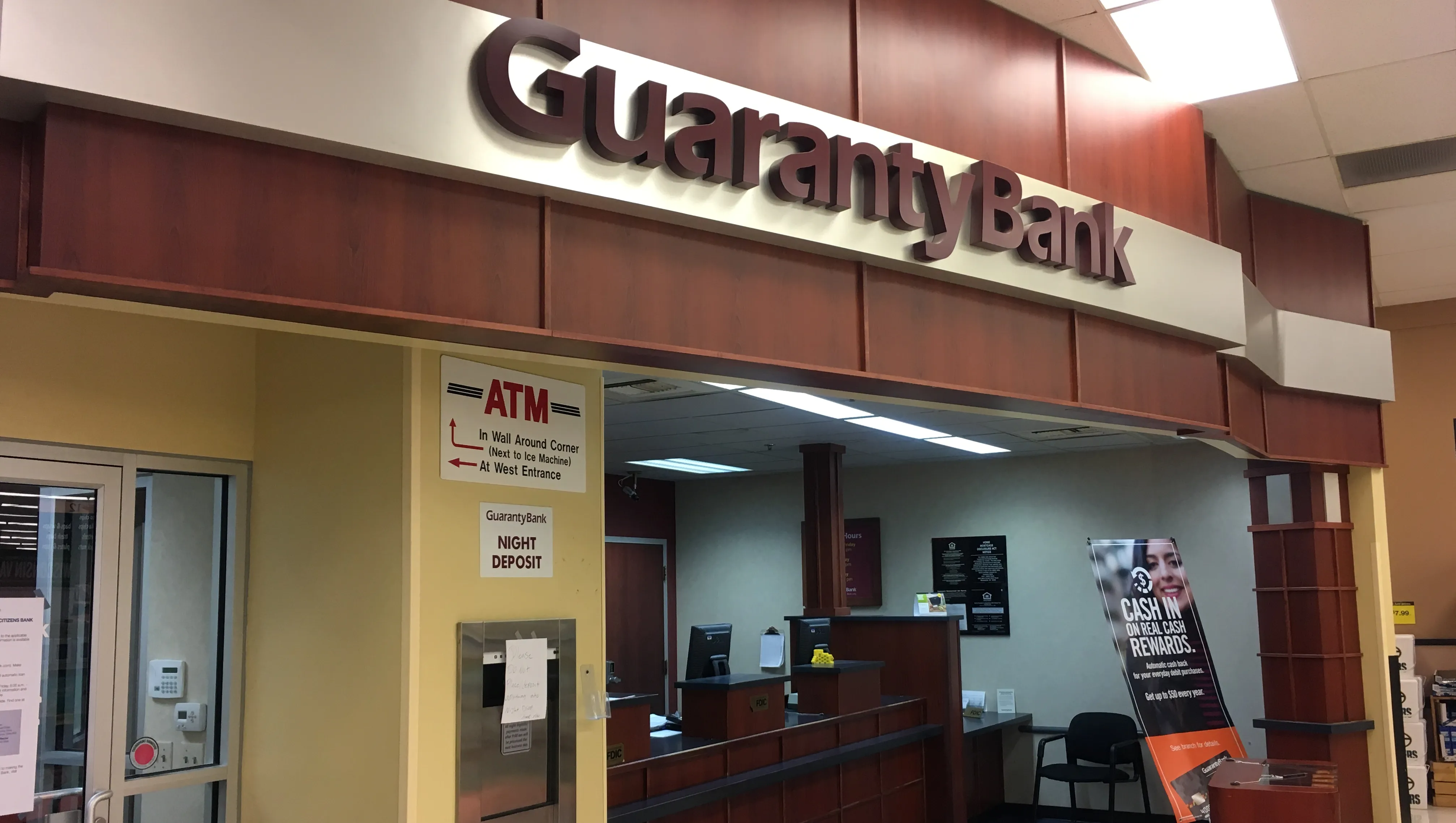
Guaranty Bank Branch in store, Brookfield, WI.

== Overview ==
Guaranty Bank (d/b/a BestBank in Georgia and Michigan) was a federally chartered thrift headquartered in Milwaukee, Wisconsin. At its peak, it operated 119 branches, of which 108 were inside supermarkets and Walmart Supercenters. The bank conducted business in Wisconsin, Illinois, Michigan, Minnesota, and Georgia. On May 5, 2017, the Office of the Comptroller of the Currency (OCC) closed the bank and appointed the Federal Deposit Insurance Corporation (FDIC) as receiver. First Citizens BancShares acquired its assets. The failure was estimated to cost the Deposit Insurance Fund $148.6 million. [OIG 2017] [OCC 2017] [FDIC]

== History ==
- 1923 – Founded as Guaranty Savings and Loan Association in Milwaukee, Wisconsin. Became federally insured in 1939 and converted to a federal stock savings bank in 2002.
- 2004 – Entered into a $2 billion residential mortgage program with Fannie Mae to increase lending to minority borrowers.
- 2005–2007 – Expanded into “Alt-A” mortgages and stated-income home equity loans, which later generated substantial credit losses.
- 2008–2009 – Home equity loans reached $849 million, more than half of the bank’s assets. Losses from these loans totaled about $191 million between 2006 and 2012.
- 2009 – Closed its wholesale mortgage division, GB Mortgage. Entered into a Cease-and-Desist Order with the Office of Thrift Supervision. [Milwaukee Business Journal, May 2009]
- 2013 – Sold Shelter Mortgage division and relocated its headquarters from Brown Deer to Glendale, Wisconsin. Capital temporarily improved following the mortgage unit sale, but the bank remained undercapitalized. [Milwaukee Journal Sentinel, Oct 2014]
- 2014 – OCC issued a Prompt Corrective Action Directive (PCAD) after declaring the bank “significantly undercapitalized.”
- 2015–2016 – Continued operating losses, poor risk management, and regulatory enforcement actions persisted. OCC examiners found accounting practices out of compliance with Generally Accepted Accounting Principles.
- 2017 – OCC determined the bank’s condition was unsafe and unsound. On May 5, it was closed and placed into receivership. [TMJ4, May 2017]
- 2022 – FDIC terminated the receivership on August 1, 2022.

== Causes of Failure ==
According to the U.S. Treasury’s Office of Inspector General, Guaranty Bank failed due to a combination of factors:

- Relaxed underwriting: Heavy reliance on Alt-A and stated-income loans left the bank with a large concentration of poor-quality assets.
- Poor risk management: Dependence on costly credit loss insurance ($105 million in premiums between 2008–2012) and under-collateralized loans undermined financial stability.
- Weak governance: The board and management were deemed “critically deficient,” failing to maintain adequate capital or internal controls.

By the time of closure, the bank had suffered cumulative losses of $178 million since 2006 and remained under regulatory enforcement orders.

== Regulatory Oversight ==
The OCC supervised Guaranty Bank beginning in 2011, following the dissolution of the Office of Thrift Supervision. Despite repeated enforcement actions, the bank’s problems persisted. The OCC attempted to rehabilitate the bank while minimizing losses to the Deposit Insurance Fund, but oversight shortcomings were later identified:

- Improper bonuses and salary increases: Between 2012–2016, Guaranty paid $468,926 in bonuses and raises to senior executives in violation of Prompt Corrective Action restrictions.
- Examination gaps: OCC examiners did not adequately track executive compensation or bonuses, delaying detection of violations until 2017.

The OIG recommended stronger examination procedures for monitoring compensation compliance at troubled banks.

== Receivership Status: TERMINATED ==
The FDIC managed Guaranty’s receivership until August 1, 2022, when it was formally terminated. By then, all required distributions had been made, and the receivership estate ceased to exist as a legal entity.

Photos of remaining Guaranty Bank property at Hmong Town Grocery Center, Milwaukee WI October 2025

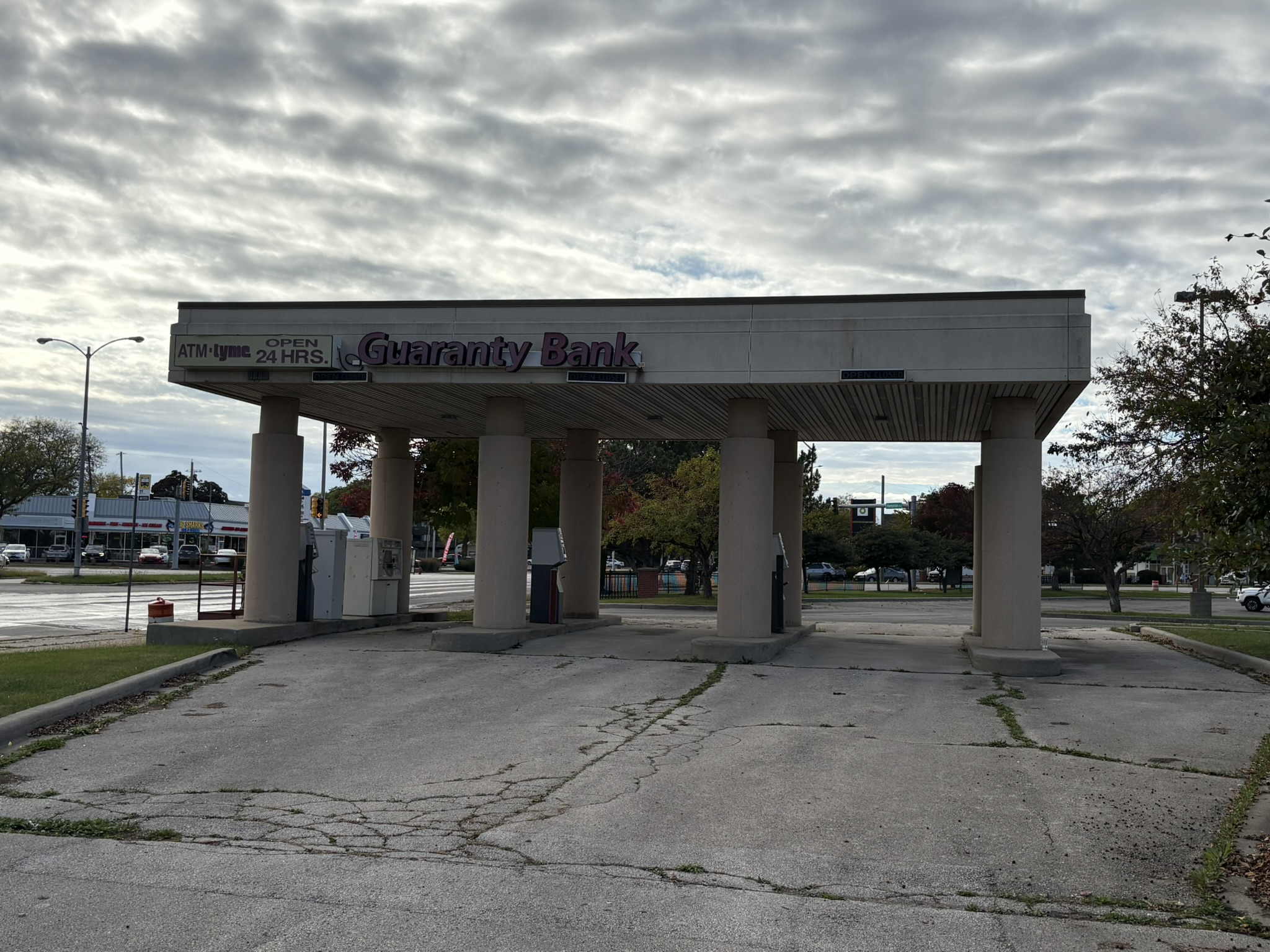
Guaranty Bank Drive Up Lanes at Hmong Town Grocery Store. 8340 W. Appleton Ave, Milwaukee WI 53218. October 2025

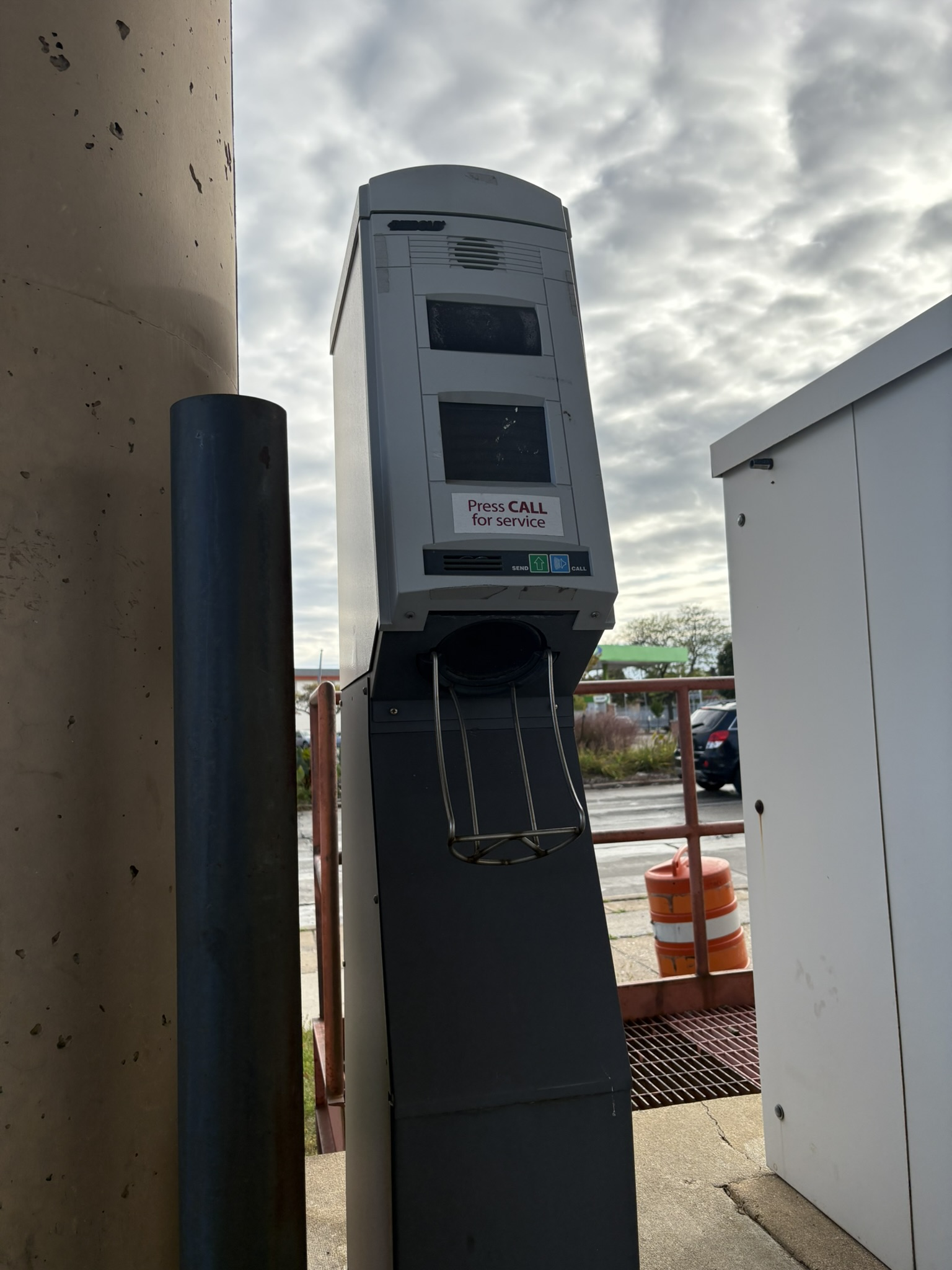
Numatec Tube Machine for Guaranty Bank - October 2025

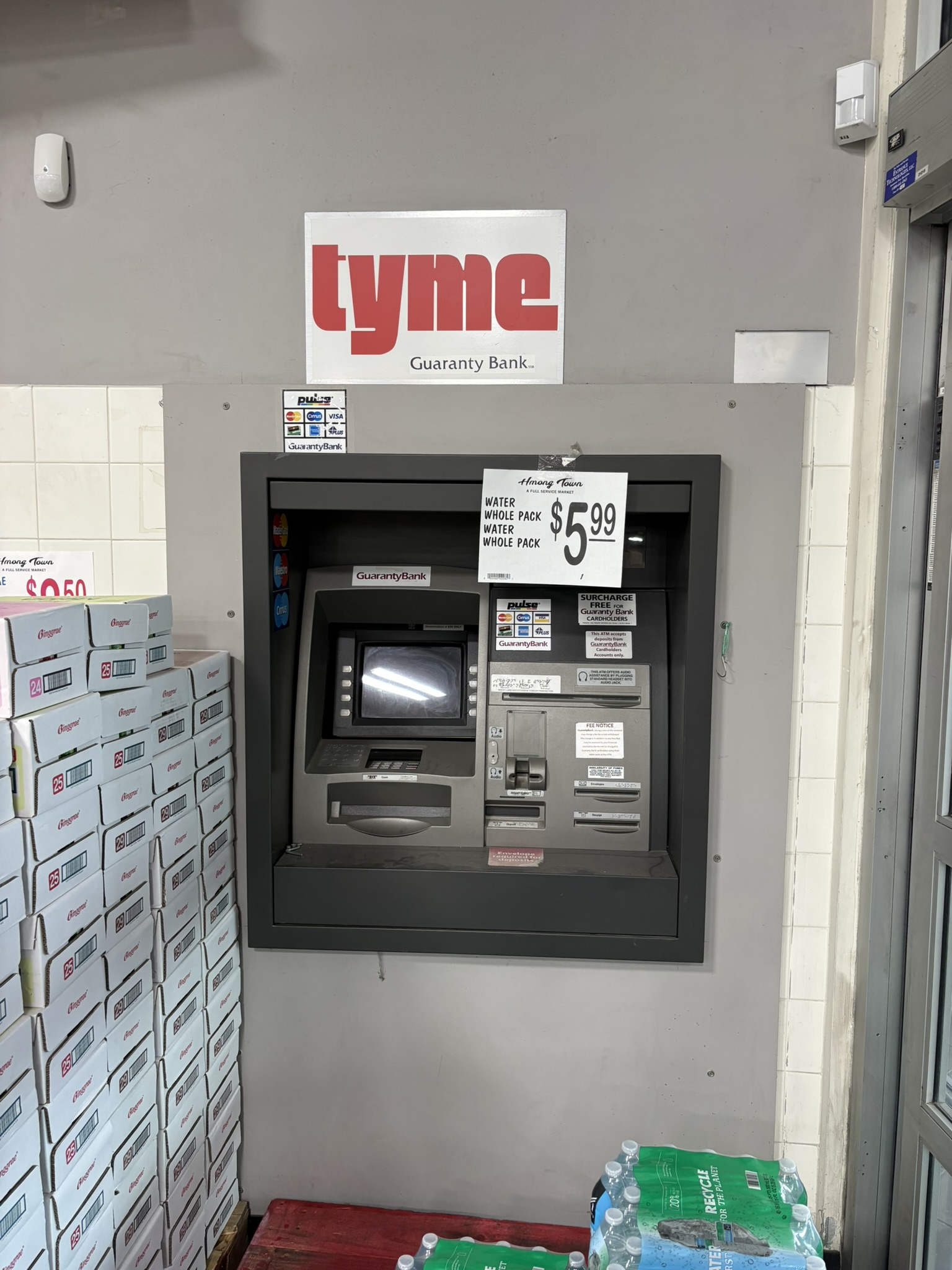
Guaranty Bank Tyme Machine at Hmong Town Grocery Store - October 2025

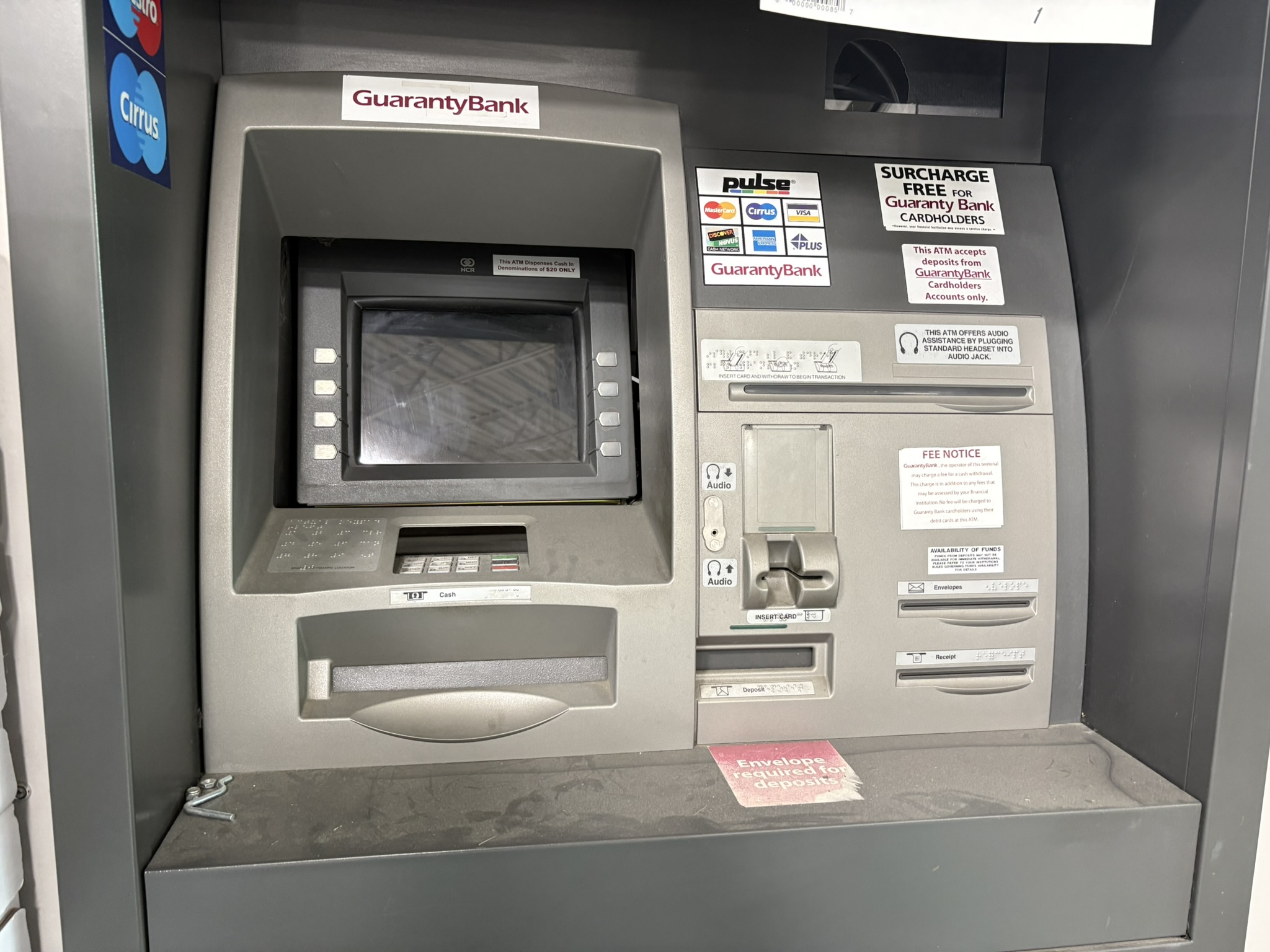
ATM for Guaranty Bank, Hmong Town Grocery Store - October 2025

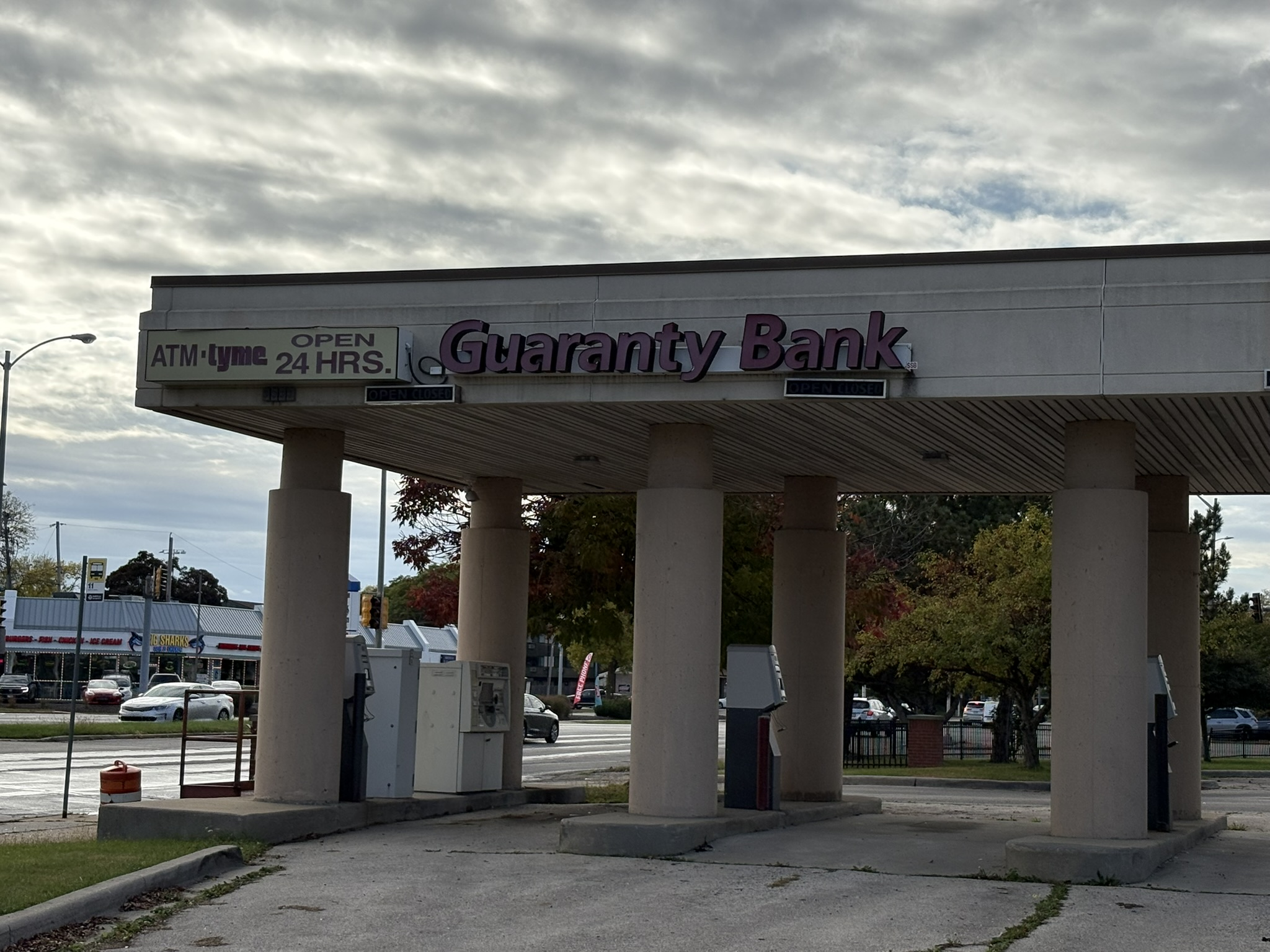
Guaranty Bank Drive Up Lanes at Hmong Town Grocery Store. 8340 W. Appleton Ave, Milwaukee WI 53218. October 2025

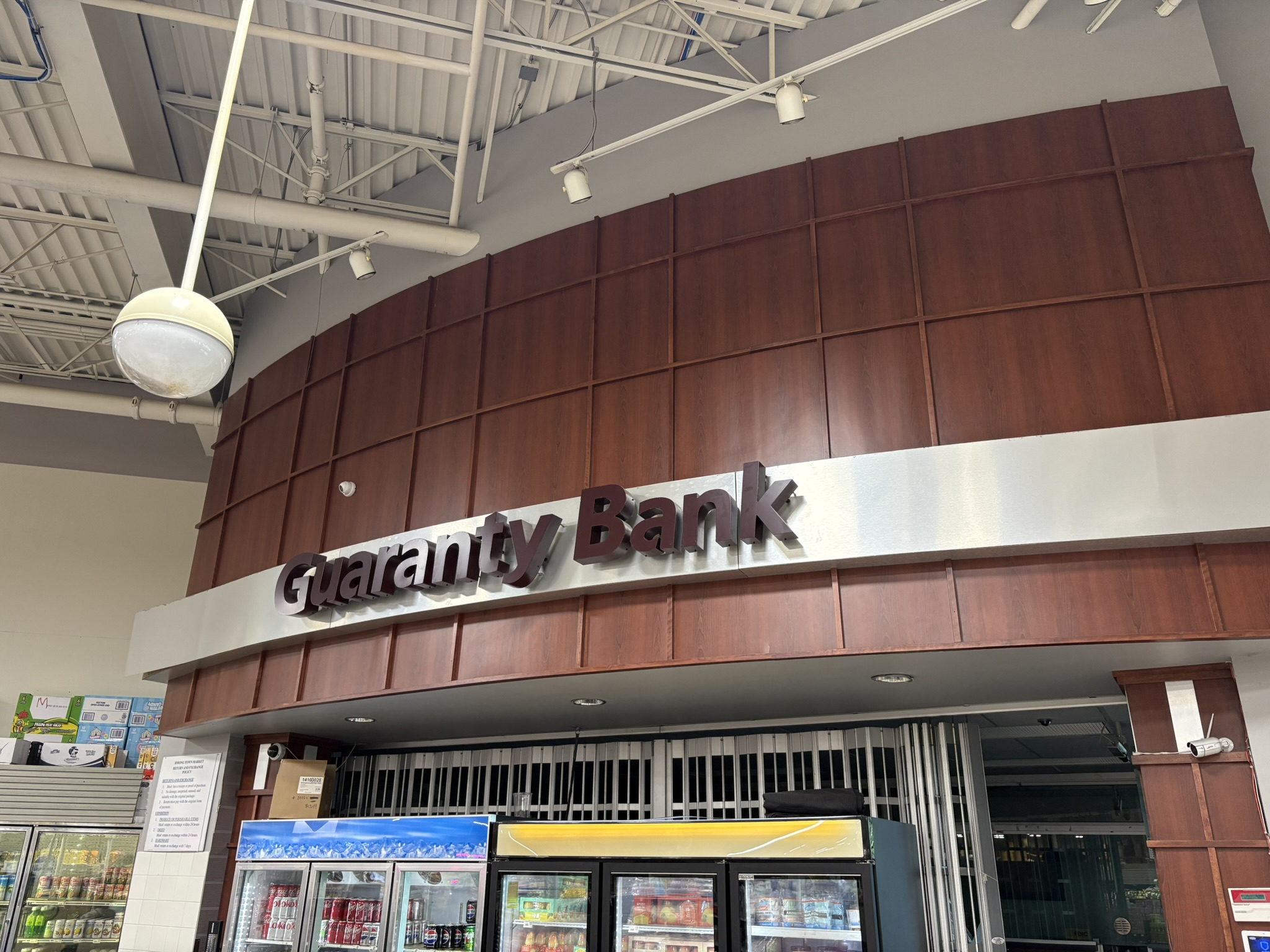
Guaranty Bank Branch in Store, Milwaukee WI. (Hmong Town Grocery Store - 8340 W. Appleton Ave. Milwaukee, WI 53218)

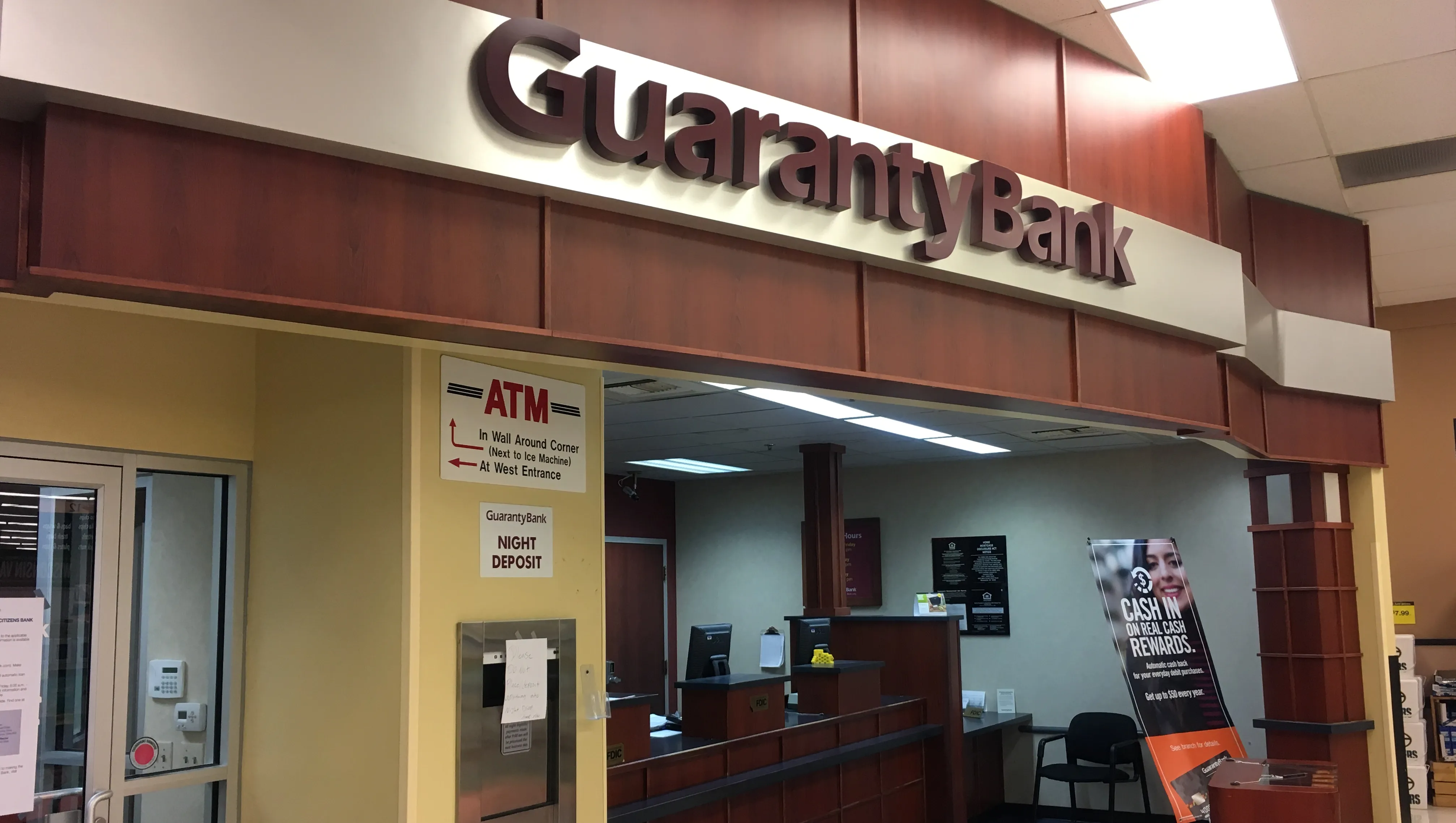
Guaranty Bank Branch, Brookfield WI 2017
