= Merit Energy Company =

- Type: Private
- Industry: Oil and Gas
- Founded: 1989
- Founder: William Gayden
- Headquarters: Dallas, Texas
- Key people: William Gayden, Chairman
- Revenue: ▲US$ 2.1 billion (2008)
- Number of employees: 679
- Website: http://www.meritenergy.com

Merit Energy Company is one of the largest privately held US-based oil and gas companies by production volume, with some $1 billion in net income on $2.1 billion in revenue. The company was formed in 1989 by William K. Gayden, formerly of EDS and Petrus Oil and Gas L.P., which was founded by H. Ross Perot.

Merit is involved in operations in 12 states throughout the United States with daily production of 65,000 barrels (10,300 cubic metres) per day of oil equivalent. Operations are divided among two divisions: North and South.

Merit specializes in purchasing high quality, producing oil and gas assets and making them more efficient. The company owns and operates over 11,000 wells in the United States. Over $5.9 billion in assets have been purchased since 1989.
