= Music Audience Exchange =

Music Audience Exchange is an American music technology company founded in 2014.

== History ==
Music Audience Exchange (MAX) was cofounded by Nathan Hanks, Justin Mink, Ryan Whisenhunt, Carlos Diaz, and George Howard in 2014, with its headquarters located in Frisco, Texas. It also works out of offices in New York City and Culver City, California. Hanks is the company’s CEO.

== Artist matching ==
The company engages with bands in order to represent them with large companies or organizations that are targeting specific local demographics, working as a coordinating agent between the artists and companies. Offers from companies are provided to artists, who have can accept or decline the terms. As of 2017, MAX was tracking 2.4 million artists within 900 genres, categorizing fans of each into around 200 different demographic categories. Companies and artists are introduced to each other via the company’s Artist Matching Engine, which utilizes neural networks to map music tastes onto variables such as demographics, psychographics, and purchase behavior. MAX also creates marketing campaigns and live experiences for audience members.

== Finances and clients ==
In 2017 MAX received $6 million in financing from MATH Venture Partners and KDWC Ventures, for a total of $9 million. Companies that MAX has worked with include Twix, Jack Daniel's, McDonald's, Wal-Mart, Coors Light, Ford, and Dr Pepper. The company also hosts artists for live performances in its offices.
