= Hamilton Shirts =

- Industry: Clothier
- Founded: 1883; 143 years ago in Houston, Texas
- Headquarters: 5700 Richmond Ave., Houston, Texas
- Key people: Jim Hamilton
- Products: Bespoke, made-to-measure, and Ready-To-Wear shirts
- Website: www.hamiltonshirts.com

Hamilton Shirts is an American shirtmaker producing ready-to-wear, made-to-measure, and bespoke shirts.

== History ==
Founded in 1883, and now in its fourth generation of family ownership, Hamilton is Houston's oldest family owned business.

== Fabrics ==
Some Hamilton fabrics are double-ply and derived from extra long staple cotton. All shirts are made in Hamilton's workshop in Houston, Texas.

Hamilton shirts are sold at its Houston headquarters, online and through luxury retailers such as Barneys New York.

== See also ==
- Alden Shoe Company
- Oxxford Clothes
- Horween Leather
- Red Wing Shoes
