= Glacier Bancorp =

U.S. banking company

Glacier Bancorp, Inc.

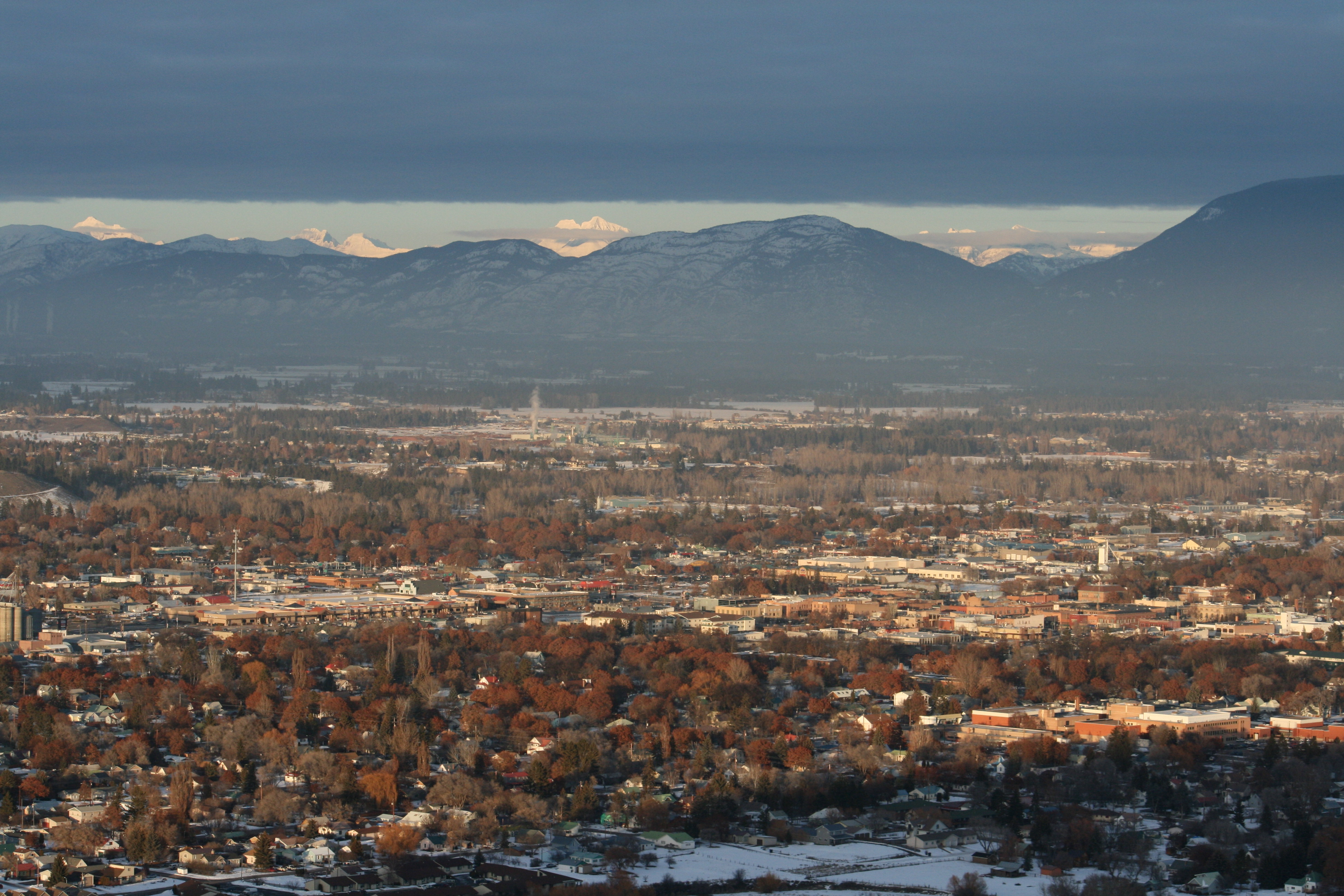
- Type: Public
- Traded as: NYSE: GBCI; S&P 400 component; Russell 2000 Index component
- Industry: Banking; Financial services
- Founded: 1990; 36 years ago
- Headquarters: 49 Commons Loop; Kalispell, Montana, U.S.
- Number of locations: 281
- Area served: Montana, Idaho, Utah, Washington, Wyoming, Colorado, Arizona, Nevada, and Texas
- Key people: Randall M. Chesler (president & CEO); Craig A. Lange (chairman)
- Services: Retail banking; Business banking; Real estate, commercial, agriculture, and consumer loans; Mortgage origination and loan servicing
- Revenue: ▲US$ 1.3 billion (2025)
- Net income: ▲US$ 239 million (2025)
- Total assets: ▲US$ 32.0 billion (2025)
- Total equity: ▲US$ 4.214 billion (2025)
- Number of employees: 4,188 (2025)
- Divisions: Altabank (UT); Bank of the San Juans (CO); Citizens Community Bank (ID); Collegiate Peaks Bank (CO); First Bank (WY); First Bank of Montana (MT); First Community Bank Utah (UT); First Security Bank (MT); First Security Bank of Missoula (MT); First State Bank (WY); Glacier Bank (MT); Heritage Bank of Nevada (NV); Mountain West Bank (ID); North Cascades Bank (WA); The Foothills Bank (AZ); Valley Bank of Helena (MT); Western Security Bank (MT)
- Website: glacierbancorp.com

Glacier Bancorp, Inc. is a regional multi-bank holding company headquartered in Kalispell, Montana, United States. It is a successor corporation to the Delaware corporation originally incorporated in 1990. The company provides personal and commercial banking services from 221 locations in Montana, Idaho, Utah, Washington, Wyoming, Colorado, Arizona, and, Nevada.

The company offers a wide range of banking products and services, including: retail banking; business banking; real estate, commercial, agriculture, and consumer loans; mortgage origination and loan servicing. Glacier Bancorp Inc. serves individuals, small to medium-sized businesses, community organizations and public entities.

== Divisions ==
As of December 31, 2024, the Bank consists of seventeen bank divisions and a corporate division. The bank divisions operate under separate names, management teams and advisory directors and include the following:

- Glacier Bank (Kalispell, Montana) with operations in Montana;
- First Security Bank of Missoula (Missoula, Montana) with operations in Montana;
- Valley Bank (Helena, Montana) with operations in Montana;
- First Security Bank (Bozeman, Montana) with operations in Montana;
- Western Security Bank (Billings, Montana) with operations in Montana;
- First Bank of Montana (Lewistown, Montana) with operations in Montana;
- Mountain West Bank (Coeur d’Alene, Idaho) with operations in Idaho and Washington;
- Citizens Community Bank (Pocatello, Idaho) with operations in Idaho;
- First Bank (Powell, Wyoming) with operations in Wyoming;
- First State Bank (Wheatland, Wyoming) with operations in Wyoming;
- Wheatland Bank (Chelan, Washington) with operations in Washington;
- First Community Bank Utah (Layton, Utah) with operations in Utah;
- Altabank (American Fork, UT) with operations in Utah and Idaho;
- Bank of the San Juans (Durango, Colorado) with operations in Colorado;
- Collegiate Peaks Bank (Buena Vista, Colorado) with operations in Colorado;
- The Foothills Bank (Yuma, Arizona) with operations in Arizona.

== History ==
First Federal Savings and Loan, now known as Glacier Bank (a subsidiary of Glacier Bancorp, Inc.) was founded in 1955 in Kalispell, Montana by a group of local businessmen. With a charter costing $150,000 in 1955, the founding directors raised $172,000 from 127 Flathead citizens to officially get the bank off the ground. In 1984, the bank went public as First Federal Savings Bank of Montana. Glacier Bancorp Inc. was established in 1990 as the parent company of First Federal. First Federal was then renamed to Glacier Bank in 1992.

On February 25, 2013, Glacier Bancorp, Inc. acquired Wyoming-based First State Bank, which held $281 million in assets as of December 31, 2012. On March 1, 2015, Glacier Bancorp, Inc. acquired Ronan-based Community Bank, which held $175 million in assets as of December 31, 2014.

In 2017, Glacier Bancorp merged with First Security Bank. On January 31, 2018, Glacier Bancorp acquired Columbine Capital Corp. and its subsidiary, Collegiate Peaks Bank. On March 1, 2018, Glacier Bancorp acquired Inter-Mountain Bancorp and its subsidiary, First Security Bank. On April 30, 2019, Glacier Bancorp, Inc. acquired FNB Bancorp and its wholly owned subsidiary, The First National Bank of Layton, which held $326 million in assets as of September 30, 2018. On July 31, 2019, Glacier Bancorp, Inc. acquired Heritage Bancorp and its wholly owned subsidiary, Heritage Bank of Nevada, which held $842 million in assets as of June 30, 2019.

On February 29, 2021, Glacier Bancorp, Inc. acquired State Bank Corp. and its wholly owned subsidiary, State Bank of Arizona, which held $677.6 million in assets as of December 31, 2020. On October 1, 2021, Glacier Bancorp, Inc. acquired Utah-based Altabancorp and its wholly owned subsidiary, Altabank, for $933.5 million.

On January 13, 2025, Glacier Bancorp, Inc. announced that it is acquiring Bank of Idaho Holding Co., the bank holding company for Bank of Idaho. The press release stated that it will be "Glacier's 26th bank acquisition since 2000 and its 12th announced transaction in the past 10 years." According to the Idaho State Journal, "After close of the transaction, Bank of Idaho’s Eastern Idaho branches will join Citizens Community Bank, Division of Glacier Bank. The remaining Bank of Idaho branches in Idaho’s Treasure Valley will join Mountain West Bank, Division of Glacier Bank and the branches in Eastern Washington will join Wheatland Bank, Division of Glacier Bank." The regulatory approvals were announced on April 9, 2025 and the transaction is scheduled to be completed on April 30, 2025.

== Locations / Properties ==
Glacier Bancorp, Inc. has 227 locations, consisting of 194 branches and 33 loan or administration offices, within 8 states across the Mountain West.

Glacier Bancorp, Inc. Locations
State	Number of Locations	Number of Counties Served	Percent of Deposits
Montana	68	20	25.9%
Idaho	30	11	8.6%
Utah	38	9	0.3%
Washington	25	11	5.8%
Wyoming	19	10	15.8%
Colorado	23	14	1.8%
Arizona	17	7	0.9%
Nevada	7	3	6.3%
Total	227	85	

Glacier Bancorp, Inc. Property Value
State	Properties Leased	Properties Owned	Net Book Value
Montana	7	61	$158,896,000
Utah	5	33	$65,746,000
Idaho	7	23	$48,076,000
Colorado	6	17	$24,744,000
Wyoming	3	16	$22,174,000
Arizona	8	9	$16,014,000
Nevada	1	6	$10,227,000
Washington	2	23	$35,416,000
Total	39	188	$381,293,000

== Leadership ==
=== Board of Directors ===
- Craig A. Langel, Chairman
- David C. Boyles, Director
- Robert A. Cashell Jr., Director
- Sherry L. Cladouhos, Director
- Jesus T. Espinoza, Director
- Annie M. Goodwin, Director
- Kristen L. Heck, Director
- Michael B. Hormaechea, Director
- Douglas J. McBride, Director
- Beth Noymer Levine, Director

=== Senior Leadership ===
- Randall M. Chesler, President, CEO, and Director (Principal Executive Officer)
- Ron J. Copher, Executive Vice President and CFO (Principal Financial and Accounting Officer)
