= Broadway Bank (Texas) =

Bank in Texas

- Type: Family-owned and locally operated
- Industry: Banking
- Founded: 1941; 85 years ago
- Headquarters: San Antonio, Texas
- Key people: Harvey P. Hartenstine, CEO and President
- Total assets: $5.9 billion in assets and $3.8 billion under wealth management (2025)
- Number of employees: 628 (2025)
- Website: https://broadway.bank

Broadway Bank is a community bank founded in 1941, founded by Col. Charles E. Cheever Sr. and his wife, Elizabeth Cheever. Broadway Bank has more than twenty five banking centers spread across San Antonio, Austin, Dallas, and the Texas Hill Country. Broadway Bank offers commercial and private banking, wealth management, business and personal banking, and insurance.

== History ==
Founded as "Broadway National Bank of Alamo Heights" in 1941 by Col. Charles E. Cheever Sr., and his wife, Elizabeth Cheever.

In the late 1950s, Charles Sr. and Elizabeth's son, Charlie Cheever Jr., stepped into the family business. Under his 50-year leadership, Broadway Bank was the first to establish a mortgage lending division (1959), extend banking hours to help working families, offer 24-hour ATMs and open a full-service neighborhood customer convenience center.

In 1983, the bank was the city’s first to offer on-site brokerage services.

In 1984, the bank began to offer a Wealth Management Division.

In 1996, Broadway Bank acquired Financial Centers in Fredericksburg, Kerrville, Boerne, Castroville, Hondo, and Seguin, Texas.

Cheever Junior’s son-in-law, James D. Goudge, became CEO in 1998. Goudge joined Broadway Bank as executive vice president of commercial banking in 1989 and ascended to chairman in 2001. Goudge was also inducted into the Texas Bankers Hall of Fame in 2023.

In 2005, the bank acquired Balcones Bank with Financial Centers in San Marcos, Wimberley, Kyle and Buda starting its move northward. Broadway Bank added Financial Centers in Bee Cave and Dripping Springs in 2010. In 2013, Broadway Bank announced its entry into the Austin region and today serves the mid-town and Round Rock areas.

In April 2016, Broadway Bank announced the appointment of David Bohne as its new chief executive officer. Bohne replaced longtime CEO Jim Goudge.

In 2018, Broadway Bank was the winner of the large division for the San Antonio Express News' Top Workplaces list. Broadway Bank CEO David Bohne attributed the bank's success to its employees. Broadway Bank redid its employee benefits program in 2017 — moving away from traditional benefits to more flexible benefits. Among the benefits the bank added is “100 percent company paid short-term disability” and a parental leave program that offers up to eight weeks of paid time off for employees who have a new addition to the family — whether by childbirth or adoption. It has moved away from a “traditional way of doing profit-sharing” to a “more market competitive bonus program. The new bonus program allows employees to choose either to contribute to their 401(k) and receive a company match (up to IRS and plan limits), or be paid in cash. Employees can also choose a combination of the two. The bank also offers mentoring and leadership programs for employees. Broadway Bank officials credit the new benefit and pay programs and other changes for helping it earn the Top Workplaces honor for large employers with at least 500 workers. It beat out 13 other companies. It’s the second straight year it has made the list.

In 2020, Broadway Bank introduced a new brand throughout the bank’s digital and physical footprint. Broadway Bank Financial Centers were rebranded and renovated with open layouts, digital screens and new signage.

In 2021 and 2022, Broadway expanded into the regions of Dallas-Fort Worth and Houston.

In 2023, Broadway Bank ranked #1 in the Extra-Large company category in the San Antonio Business Journal’s 2023 Best Places to Work list.

In 2024, Broadway Bank was recognized as one of America’s Best Regional Banks 2024 by Newsweek and Plant-A Insights Group, receiving a five-star rating.

In 2025, Broadway Bank announced the appointment of longtime executive Harvey P. Hartenstine to the role of Interim CEO and President. Hartenstine, an inductee to both the San Antonio Business Hall of Fame and the Texas Bankers Legacy Hall of Fame in 2025, assumed the post in mid-July.

In 2026, Broadway Bank announced the promotion of Harvey P. Hartenstine to CEO and President.

== Current operations ==
Broadway Bank is still owned by the Cheever family and in its fourth generation of family ownership. "/> At the end of 2025, the bank had more than $5.9 billion in assets and $3.8 billion in Wealth Management assets, and was one of the largest privately owned banks in the Lone Star State.

== Awards ==
2024 America’s Best Regional Banks 2024 by Newsweek and Plant-A Insights Group; 2024 Outstanding Philanthropic Corporation Award from the Association of Fundraising Professionals on the 40th Anniversary of National Philanthropy Day; 2023 Best Places to Work from the San Antonio Business Journal (since 2018); 2022 Aetna® Workplace Well‑being Making a Difference Award; 2022 Best Digital Solution BCX Award; 2022 Best Financial Planning Services YourSA Reader's Choice Awards; 2022 Top Workplaces from the San Antonio Express News (since 2017) and Austin American-Statesman (since 2015); 2020 IDC Real Results Omni-Channel Experience Award for Digital Banking; 2020 Cornerstone RAVE Award for Transformational HR & Talent Strategy
