= 2024 Louisiana Tech Bulldogs football team =

American college football season

2024 Louisiana Tech Bulldogs football

Independence Bowl, L 6–27 vs. Army
- Conference: Conference USA
- Record: 5–8 (4–4 C-USA)
- Head coach: Sonny Cumbie (3rd season)
- Co-offensive coordinators: Scott Parr (3rd season); Nathan Young (1st season)
- Offensive scheme: Spread
- Defensive coordinator: Jeremiah Johnson (1st season)
- Co-defensive coordinator: Jeff Burris (1st season)
- Base defense: 3–4
- Home stadium: Joe Aillet Stadium

2024 Conference USA football standings
	Conf.			Overall
Team	W		L	W		L
Jacksonville State y$	7	–	1	9	–	5
Western Kentucky y	6	–	2	8	–	6
Sam Houston	6	–	2	10	–	3
Liberty	5	–	3	8	–	4
Louisiana Tech	4	–	4	5	–	8
UTEP	3	–	5	3	–	9
FIU	3	–	5	4	–	8
New Mexico State	2	–	6	3	–	9
Middle Tennessee	2	–	6	3	–	9
Kennesaw State*	2	–	6	2	–	10
Championship: Jacksonville State 52, Western Kentucky 12
$ – Conference champion; y – Championship game participant; * – Ineligible for postseason play due to FCS-to-FBS transition rules

The 2024 Louisiana Tech Bulldogs football team represented Louisiana Tech University in Conference USA (C-USA) during the 2024 NCAA Division I FBS football season. The Bulldogs were led by Sonny Cumbie in his third year as the head coach. The Bulldogs played their home games at Joe Aillet Stadium, located in Ruston, Louisiana.

The Bulldogs finished their regular season with an overall record of 5–7 (4–4 in conference), and initially were not selected for post-season play. However, on December 14, Louisiana Tech was selected to replace Marshall in the Independence Bowl, after Marshall withdrew from that contest.

== Preseason ==
=== Conference USA media poll ===
The Conference USA preseason media prediction poll was released on July 19, 2024. The Bulldogs were predicted to finish seventh in the conference.

== Schedule ==
Date	Time	Opponent	Site	TV	Result	Attendance
August 31	7:00 p.m.	No. 23 (FCS) Nicholls*	Joe Aillet Stadium; Ruston, LA	ESPN+	W 25–17	16,570
September 14	11:00 a.m.	at NC State*	Carter–Finley Stadium; Raleigh, NC	ACCN	L 20–30	56,919
September 21	6:00 p.m.	Tulsa*	Joe Aillet Stadium; Ruston, LA	ESPN+	L 20–23 ^{OT}	18,152
September 28	5:00 p.m.	at FIU	Pitbull Stadium; Miami, FL	ESPN+	L 10–17	12,425
October 10	7:00 p.m.	Middle Tennessee	Joe Aillet Stadium; Ruston, LA	CBSSN	W 48–21	15,072
October 15	8:00 p.m.	at New Mexico State	Aggie Memorial Stadium; Las Cruces, NM	ESPNU	L 30–33 ^{2OT}	9,671
October 22	7:00 p.m.	UTEP	Joe Aillet Stadium; Ruston, LA	CBSSN	W 14–10	15,168
October 29	7:00 p.m.	at Sam Houston	Bowers Stadium; Huntsville, TX	ESPNU	L 3–9	9,128
November 9	3:30 p.m.	Jacksonville State^{†}	Joe Aillet Stadium; Ruston, LA	CBSSN	L 37–44 ^{OT}	16,345
November 16	11:00 a.m.	at Western Kentucky	Houchens Industries–L. T. Smith Stadium; Bowling Green, KY	CBSSN	W 12–7	13,312
November 23	3:00 p.m.	at Arkansas*	Donald W. Reynolds Razorback Stadium; Fayetteville, AR	SECN+/ESPN+	L 14–35	66,041
November 30	3:00 p.m.	Kennesaw State	Joe Aillet Stadium; Ruston, LA	ESPN+	W 33–0	14,686
December 28	8:15 p.m.	vs. No. 22 Army*	Independence Stadium; Shreveport, LA (Independence Bowl)	ESPN	L 6–27	34,283
*Non-conference game; ^{†}Homecoming; Rankings from AP Poll and CFP Rankings (after November 5) released prior to game; All times are in Eastern time

== Game summaries ==
=== No. 23 (FCS) Nicholls ===
No. 23 (FCS) Nicholls Colonels at Louisiana Tech Bulldogs – Game summary

Quarter	1	2	3	4	Total
No. 23 (FCS) Colonels	7	3	0	7	17
Bulldogs	9	6	0	10	25

at Joe Aillet Stadium, Ruston, Louisiana

- Date: August 31
- Game time: 7:00 p.m. CDT
- Game weather: Cloudy, 79 °F (26 °C)
- Game attendance: 16,570
- Referee: Scott Hardin
- TV announcers (ESPN+): Chris Mycoskie (play-by-play), Shea Walker (analyst), and Madison Kaufman (sideline)
- Box score, Recap

Game information
First quarter
- LT – Jaylon Spears tackled in own end zone, 12:55. Bulldogs 2–0.
- NICH – Rasheed Lovelace 25-yard interception return (Ray Vallee kick), 11:22. Colonels 7–2.
- LT – Solo Lewis 28-yard pass from Jack Turner (Buck Buchanan kick), 10:14. Bulldogs 9–7. Drive: 3 plays, 59 yards, 1:02.

Second quarter

- LT – Marlion Jackson 14-yard pass from Blake Baker (kick blocked), 8:27. Bulldogs 15–7. Drive: 2 plays, 16 yards, 0:44.
- NICH – Gabe Showalter 38-yard field goal, 0:56. Bulldogs 15–10. Drive: 4 plays, 0 yards, 0:25.

Third quarter

- No scoring plays

Fourth quarter

- LT – Buck Buchanan 24-yard field goal, 12:41. Bulldogs 18–10. Drive: 9 plays, 79 yards, 3:56.
- LT – Jimmy Holiday 6-yard run (Buck Buchanan kick), 7:12. Bulldogs 25–10. Drive: 8 plays, 71 yards, 4:15.
- NICH – Quincy Brown 27-yard pass from Pat McQuaide (Ray Vallee kick), 2:17. Bulldogs 25–17. Drive: 5 plays, 65 yards, 1:47.

Statistics	NICH	LT
First downs	13	16
Total yards	200	386
Rushing yards	62	109
Passing yards	138	277
Turnovers	1	5
Time of possession	28:18	31:42

Team	Category	Player	Statistics
Nicholls	Passing	Pat McQuaide	10/26, 138 yards, TD
Nicholls	Rushing	Collin Guggenheim	18 rushes, 79 yards
Nicholls	Receiving	Quincy Brown	4 receptions, 70 yards, TD
Louisiana Tech	Passing	Blake Baker	12/24, 207 yards, TD, 2 INT
Louisiana Tech	Rushing	Marquis Crosby	9 rushes, 44 yards
Louisiana Tech	Receiving	Marlion Jackson	3 receptions, 76 yards, TD

=== At NC State ===
Louisiana Tech Bulldogs at NC State Wolfpack – Game summary

Quarter	1	2	3	4	Total
Bulldogs	0	17	3	0	20
Wolfpack	3	3	14	10	30

at Carter–Finley Stadium, Raleigh, North Carolina

- Date: September 14
- Game time: 11:00 a.m. CDT/12:00 p.m. EDT
- Game weather: Cloudy, 78 °F (26 °C)
- Game attendance: 56,919
- Referee: Nate Black
- TV announcers (ACCN): Jorge Sedano, Orlando Franklin, and Morgan Uber
- Box score, Recap

Game information
First quarter
- NCSU – Kanoah Vinesett 39-yard field goal, 5:04. Wolfpack 3–0. Drive: 7 plays, 18 yards, 4:24.

Second quarter

- NCSU – Kanoah Vinesett 35-yard field goal, 5:29. Wolfpack 6–0. Drive: 13 plays, 63 yards, 6:27.
- LT – Donerio Davenport 5-yard run (Buck Buchanan kick), 2:41. Bulldogs 7–6. Drive: 6 plays, 75 yards, 2:47.
- LT – Tru Edwards 71-yard pass from Jack Turner (Buck Buchanan kick), 1:19. Bulldogs 14–6. Drive: 1 play, 71 yards, 0:13.
- LT – Buck Buchanan 57-yard field goal, 0:13. Bulldogs 17–6. Drive: 4 plays, 6 yards, 0:48.

Third quarter

- NCSU – D. K. Kaufman 33-yard interception return (Kanoah Vinesett kick), 14:03. Bulldogs 17–13.
- NCSU – Kendrick Raphael 3-yard run (Kanoah Vinesett kick), 4:23. Wolfpack 20–17. Drive: 13 plays, 76 yards, 8:11.
- LT – Buck Buchanan 20-yard field goal, 0:36. Tied 20–20. Drive: 9 plays, 73 yards, 3:47.

Fourth quarter

- NCSU – Kanoah Vinesett 52-yard field goal, 12:32. Wolfpack 23–20. Drive: 9 plays, 40 yards, 3:04.
- NCSU – C. J. Bailey 1-yard run (Kanoah Vinesett kick), 7:21. Wolfpack 30–20. Drive: 8 plays, 66 yards, 4:12.

Statistics	LT	NCST
First downs	12	20
Total yards	324	361
Rushing yards	43	151
Passing yards	281	210
Turnovers	2	1
Time of possession	23:24	36:36

Team	Category	Player	Statistics
Louisiana Tech	Passing	Jack Turner	19/36, 281 yards, TD, INT
Louisiana Tech	Rushing	Donerio Davenport	6 rushes, 21 yards, TD
Louisiana Tech	Receiving	Tru Edwards	4 receptions, 148 yards, TD
NC State	Passing	C. J. Bailey	13/20, 156 yards, INT
NC State	Rushing	Kendrick Raphael	9 rushes, 63 yards, TD
NC State	Receiving	Dacari Collins	3 receptions, 55 yards

=== Tulsa ===
Tulsa Golden Hurricane at Louisiana Tech Bulldogs – Game summary

Quarter	1	2	3	4	OT	Total
Golden Hurricane	7	3	7	3	3	23
Bulldogs	0	7	0	13	0	20

at Joe Aillet Stadium, Ruston, Louisiana

- Date: September 21
- Game time: 6:00 p.m. CDT
- Game weather: Sunny • Temperature: 91 °F (33 °C) • Wind: SE at 5 miles per hour (8.0 km/h)
- Game attendance: 18,152
- Referee: Reid Jackson
- TV announcers (ESPN+): Lyn Rollins (play-by-play), Chris Mycoskie (analyst) and Madison Kaufman (sideline)
- Box score, Recap

Game information
First quarter
- TLSA – Anthony Watkins 30-yard run (Seth Morgan kick), 4:05. Golden Hurricane 7–0. Drive: 5 plays, 40 yards, 2:11.

Second quarter

- LT – Jimmy Holiday 1-yard run (Buck Buchanan kick), 11:50. Tied 7–7. Drive: 5 plays, 25 yards, 2:18.
- TLSA – Seth Morgan 32-yard field goal, 4:50. Golden Hurricane 10–7. Drive: 9 plays, 28 yards, 4:25.

Third quarter

- TLSA – Corey Smith 38-yard pass from Kirk Francis (Seth Morgan kick), 0:03. Golden Hurricane 17–7. Drive: 5 plays, 85 yards, 3:14.

Fourth quarter

- LT – Blake Baker 1-yard run (run failed), 12:08. Golden Hurricanes 17–13. Drive: 7 plays, 79 yards, 2:52.
- LT – Eli Finley 24-yard pass from Evan Bullock (Buck Buchanan kick), 3:14. Bulldogs 20–17. Drive: 5 plays, 43 yards, 1:41.
- TLSA – Seth Morgan 45-yard field goal, 0:32. Tied 20–20. Drive: 9 plays, 48 yards, 2:42.

Overtime

- TLSA – Seth Morgan 34-yard field goal. Golden Hurricane 23–20. Drive: 4 plays, 9 yards.

Statistics	TLSA	LT
First downs	14	17
Total yards	333	284
Rushing yards	105	87
Passing yards	228	197
Turnovers	0	3
Time of possession	30:00	30:00

Team	Category	Player	Statistics
Tulsa	Passing	Kirk Francis	24/36, 228 yards, TD
Tulsa	Rushing	Anthony Watkins	10 rushes, 60 yards, TD
Tulsa	Receiving	Kamdyn Benjamin	8 receptions, 69 yards
Louisiana Tech	Passing	Blake Baker	6/10, 107 yards, INT
Louisiana Tech	Rushing	Fred Robertson	7 rushes, 39 yards
Louisiana Tech	Receiving	Eli Finley	3 receptions, 91 yards, TD

=== At FIU ===
Louisiana Tech Bulldogs at FIU Panthers – Game summary

Quarter	1	2	3	4	Total
Bulldogs	0	0	10	0	10
Panthers	7	0	7	3	17

at Pitbull Stadium, Miami, Florida

- Date: September 28
- Game time: 5:00 p.m. CDT/6:00 p.m. EDT
- Game weather: Sunny, 87 °F (31 °C)
- Game attendance: 12,425
- Referee: Reed Brotherton
- TV announcers (ESPN+): AJ Ricketts (play-by-play) and Zach Leston (analyst)
- Box score, Recap

Game information
First quarter
- FIU – Eric Rivers 10-yard pass from Keyone Jenkins (Alejandro Prado kick), 2:26. Panthers 7–0. Drive: 13 plays, 84 yards, 7:02.

Second quarter

- No scoring plays

Third quarter

- FIU – Lexington Joseph 6-yard run (Alejandro Prado kick), 10:38. Panthers 14–0. Drive: 6 plays, 56 yards, 3:04.
- LT – Jimmy Holiday 5-yard run (Buck Buchanan kick), 7:04. Panthers 14–7. Drive: 8 plays, 63 yards, 3:23.
- LT – Buck Buchanan 34-yard field goal, 2:43. Panthers 14–10. Drive: 7 plays, 37 yards, 2:13.

Fourth quarter

- FIU – Alejandro Prado 25-yard field goal, 7:08. Panthers 17–10. Drive: 9 plays, 53 yards, 5:13.

Statistics	LT	FIU
First downs	16	21
Total yards	297	304
Rushing yards	79	87
Passing yards	218	217
Turnovers	1	1
Time of possession	29:12	30:48

Team	Category	Player	Statistics
Louisiana Tech	Passing	Evan Bullock	26/37, 218 yards
Louisiana Tech	Rushing	Donerio Davenport	6 rushes, 25 yards
Louisiana Tech	Receiving	Marlion Jackson	5 receptions, 81 yards
FIU	Passing	Keyone Jenkins	17/31, 208 yards, TD
FIU	Rushing	Lexington Joseph	13 rushes, 73 yards, TD
FIU	Receiving	Eric Rivers	7 receptions, 97 yards, TD

=== Middle Tennessee ===
Middle Tennessee Blue Raiders at Louisiana Tech Bulldogs – Game summary

Quarter	1	2	3	4	Total
Blue Raiders	14	0	7	0	21
Bulldogs	20	14	14	0	48

at Joe Aillet Stadium, Ruston, Louisiana

- Date: October 10
- Game time: 7:00 p.m. CDT
- Game weather: Sunny, 73 °F (23 °C)
- Game attendance: 15,072
- Referee: Rodney Burnette
- TV announcers (CBSSN): Alex Del Barrio (play-by-play) and Brock Vereen (analyst)
- Box score, Recap

Game information
First quarter
- MTSU – Holden Willis 18-yard pass from Nicholas Vattiato (Zeke Rankin kick), 12:25. Blue Raiders 7–0. Drive: 6 plays, 75 yards, 2:35.
- LT – Omiri Wiggins 5-yard pass from Evan Bullock (Buck Buchanan kick), 9:42. Tied 7–7. Drive: 5 plays, 36 yards, 2:30.
- MTSU – Jekali Middlebrook 24-yard pass from Nicholas Vattiato (Zeke Rankin kick), 6:35. Blue Raiders 14–7. Drive: 9 plays, 75 yards, 3:07.
- LT – Jimmy Holiday 15-yard pass from Evan Bullock, 2:36. Blue Raiders 14–13. Drive: 9 plays, 75 yards, 3:59.
- LT – Omiri Wiggins 16-yard pass from Evan Bullock (Buck Buchanan kick), 0:34. Bulldogs 20–14. Drive: 4 plays, 44 yards, 1:16.

Second quarter

- LT – Jay Wilkerson 20-yard pass from Evan Bullock (Buck Buchanan kick), 12:26. Bulldogs 27–14. Drive: 4 plays, 53 yards, 1:41.
- LT – Evan Bullock 1-yard run (Buck Buchanan kick), 4:16. Bulldogs 34–14. Drive: 9 plays, 65 yards, 4:53.

Third quarter

- LT – Tru Edwards 75-yard pass from Evan Bullock (Buck Buchanan kick), 14:06. Bulldogs 41–14. Drive: 3 plays, 75 yards, 0:54.
- MTSU – Jaiden Credle 8-yard run (Zeke Rankin kick), 10:06. Bulldogs 41–21. Drive: 9 plays, 75 yards, 3:57.
- LT – Solo Lewis 19-yard pass from Marquis Crosby (Buck Buchanan kick), 5:14. Bulldogs 48–21. Drive: 8 plays, 77 yards, 4:49.

Fourth quarter

- No scoring plays.

Statistics	MTSU	LT
First downs	17	27
Total yards	336	551
Rushing yards	60	222
Passing yards	276	329
Turnovers	2	1
Time of possession	25:37	34:23

Team	Category	Player	Statistics
Middle Tennessee	Passing	Nicholas Vattiato	24/39, 276 yards, 2 TD, INT
Middle Tennessee	Rushing	Jekail Middlebrook	5 rushes, 30 yards
Middle Tennessee	Receiving	Omari Kelly	8 receptions, 103 yards
Louisiana Tech	Passing	Evan Bullock	18/25, 290 yards, 5 TD
Louisiana Tech	Rushing	Omiri Wiggins	8 rushes, 49 yards
Louisiana Tech	Receiving	Tru Edwards	6 receptions, 127 yards, TD

=== At New Mexico State ===
Louisiana Tech Bulldogs at New Mexico State Aggies – Game summary

Quarter	1	2	3	4	OT	2OT	Total
Bulldogs	0	14	0	10	3	3	30
Aggies	0	10	7	7	3	6	33

at Aggie Memorial Stadium, Las Cruces, New Mexico

- Date: October 15
- Game time: 8:00 p.m. CDT/7:00 p.m. MDT
- Game weather: Sunny • Temperature: 80 °F (27 °C) • Wind: SW at 4 miles per hour (6.4 km/h)
- Referee: Douglas Mercer
- TV announcers (ESPNU): Mike Corey (play-by-play) and Forrest Conoly (analyst)
- Box score, Recap

Game information

First quarter

No scoring plays

Second quarter

- (11:44) NMSU – TJ Pride 53-yard pass from Parker Awad, Abraham Montano kick (Drive: 3 plays, 56 yards, 1:20; New Mexico State 7–0)
- (4:59) LT – Tru Edwards 7-yard pass from Evan Bullock, Buck Buchanan kick (Drive: 15 plays, 75 yards, 6:45; Tied 7–7)
- (1:12) LT – Omiri Wiggins 1-yard run, Buck Buchanan kick (Drive: 7 plays, 55 yards, 2:20; Louisiana Tech 14–7)
- (0:04) NMSU – Abraham Montano 48-yard field goal (Drive: 7 plays, 39 yards, 1:08; Louisiana Tech 14–10)

Third quarter

- (8:26) NMSU – Brandon Nunez 7-yard run, Abraham Montano kick (Drive: 11 plays, 88 yards, 5:50; New Mexico State 17–14)

Fourth quarter

- (12:11) LT – Buck Buchanan 41-yard field goal (Drive: 14 plays, 46 yards, 6:29; Tied 17–17)
- (4:54) LT – Tru Edwards 15-yard pass from Evan Bullock, Buck Buchanan kick (Drive: 10 plays, 80 yards, 5:47; Louisiana Tech 24–17)
- (1:41) NMSU – Brandon Nunez 4-yard run, Abraham Montano kick (Drive: 11 plays, 75 yards, 3:13; Tied 24–24)

Overtime

- (0:00) NMSU – Abraham Montano 38-yard field goal (Drive: 4 plays, 5 yards, 0:00; New Mexico State 27–24)
- (0:00) LT – Buck Buchanan 37-yard field goal (Drive: 4 plays, 6 yards, 0:00; Tied 27–27)

Second overtime

- (0:00) LT – Buck Buchanan 36-yard field goal (Drive: 4 plays, 7 yards, 0:00; Louisiana Tech 30–27)
- (0:00) NMSU – Mike Washington 4-yard run (Drive: 4 plays, 25 yards, 0:00; New Mexico State 33–30)

Statistics	LT	NMSU
First downs	20	21
Total yards	360	364
Rushing yards	127	160
Passing yards	233	204
Turnovers	0	2
Time of possession	37:11	22:49

Team	Category	Player	Statistics
Louisiana Tech	Passing	Evan Bullock	22/41, 233 yards, 2 TD
Louisiana Tech	Rushing	Omiri Wiggins	14 carries, 63 yards, TD
Louisiana Tech	Receiving	Tru Edwards	9 receptions, 110 yards, TD
New Mexico State	Passing	Parker Awad	11/22, 155 yards, TD
New Mexico State	Rushing	Seth McGowan	17 carries, 66 yards
New Mexico State	Receiving	T. J. Pride	4 receptions, 69 yards, TD

=== UTEP ===
UTEP Miners at Louisiana Tech Bulldogs – Game summary

Quarter	1	2	3	4	Total
Miners	7	0	3	0	10
Bulldogs	0	7	0	7	14

at Joe Aillet Stadium, Ruston, Louisiana

- Date: October 22
- Game time: 7:00 p.m. CDT
- Game weather: Sunny, 74 °F (23 °C)
- Game attendance: 15,168
- Referee: Rory Bernard
- TV announcers (CBSSN): Alex Del Barrio (play-by-play) and Donte Whitner (analyst)
- Box score, Recap

Game information
First quarter
- UTEP – Kam Thomas 47-yard pass from Skyler Locklear (Buzz Flabiano kick), 8:59. Miners 7–0. Drive: 8 plays, 94 yards, 3:02.

Second quarter

- LT – Solo Lewis 48-yard pass from Evan Bullock (Buck Buchanan kick), 5:49. Tied 7–7. Drive: 4 plays, 73 yards, 1:58.

Third quarter

- UTEP – Buzz Flabiano 44-yard field goal, 2:02. Miners 10–7. Drive: 8 plays, 53 yards, 3:43.

Fourth quarter

- LT – Amani Givens 1-yard run (Buck Buchanan kick), 6:28. Bulldogs 14–10. Drive: 11 plays, 97 yards, 5:27.

Statistics	UTEP	LT
First downs	14	12
Total yards	251	255
Rushing yards	166	7
Passing yards	85	248
Turnovers	0	0
Time of possession	28:48	31:12

Team	Category	Player	Statistics
UTEP	Passing	Skyler Locklear	7/11, 76 yards, TD
UTEP	Rushing	Jevon Jackson	22 rushes, 112 yards
UTEP	Receiving	Kam Thomas	5 receptions, 67 yards, TD
Louisiana Tech	Passing	Evan Bullock	22/30, 248 yards, TD
Louisiana Tech	Rushing	Jimmy Holiday	6 rushes, 18 yards
Louisiana Tech	Receiving	Jimmy Holiday	6 receptions, 93 yards

=== At Sam Houston ===
Louisiana Tech Bulldogs at Sam Houston Bearkats – Game summary

Quarter	1	2	3	4	Total
Bulldogs	3	0	0	0	3
Bearkats	2	0	7	0	9

at Bowers Stadium, Huntsville, Texas

- Date: October 29
- Game time: 7:00 p.m. CDT
- Game weather: Sunny, 79 °F (26 °C)
- Game attendance: 9,128
- Referee: Ron Hudson
- TV announcers (ESPNU): Mike Corey (play-by-play) and Rene Ingoglia (analyst)
- Box score, Recap

Game information
First quarter
- LT – Buck Buchanan 24-yard field goal, 2:24. Bulldogs 3–0. Drive: 13 plays, 48 yards, 5:24.
- SHSU – Kendrick DuJour safety, 0:00. Bulldogs 3–2.

Second quarter

- No scoring plays

Third quarter

- SHSU – Jay Ducker 40-yard run (Christian Pavon kick), 11:40. Bearkats 9–3. Drive: 7 plays, 75 yards, 3:20.

Fourth quarter

- No scoring plays

Statistics	LT	SHSU
First downs	20	11
Total yards	312	268
Rushing yards	105	105
Passing yards	207	163
Turnovers	4	2
Time of possession	32:33	27:27

Team	Category	Player	Statistics
Louisiana Tech	Passing	Evan Bullock	16/25, 148 yards, INT
Louisiana Tech	Rushing	Omiri Wiggins	11 rushes, 49 yards
Louisiana Tech	Receiving	Tru Edwards	8 receptions, 80 yards
Sam Houston	Passing	Hunter Watson	14/22, 146 yards, INT
Sam Houston	Rushing	Jay Ducker	13 rushes, 72 yards, TD
Sam Houston	Receiving	Noah Smith	6 receptions, 47 yards

=== Jacksonville State ===
Jacksonville State Gamecocks at Louisiana Tech Bulldogs – Game summary

Quarter	1	2	3	4	OT	Total
Gamecocks	7	21	0	9	7	44
Bulldogs	7	14	9	7	0	37

at Joe Aillet Stadium, Ruston, Louisiana

- Date: November 9
- Game time: 3:30 p.m. CDT
- Game weather: Rain, 74 °F (23 °C)
- Game attendance: 16,345
- Referee: Garrett Dickerson
- TV announcers (CBSSN): Chris Lewis (play-by-play) and Randy Cross (analyst)
- Box score, Recap

Game information
First quarter
- JVST – Andrew Paul 1-yard run (Garrison Rippa kick), 8:57. Gamecocks 7–0. Drive: 17 plays, 75 yards, 6:03.
- LT – Tru Edwards 86-yard pass from Evan Bullock (Buck Buchanan kick), 1:32. Tied 7–7. Drive: 1 play, 86 yards, 0:14.

Second quarter

- JVST – Tre Stewart 4-yard run (Garrison Rippa kick), 11:56. Gamecocks 14–7. Drive: 12 plays, 75 yards, 4:36.
- JVST – Tyler Huff 1-yard run (Garrison Rippa kick), 8:25. Gamecocks 21–7. Drive: 3 plays, 2 yards, 0:51.
- LT – Jimmy Holiday 2-yard run (Buck Buchanan kick), 4:59. Gamecocks 21–14. Drive: 8 plays, 75 yards, 3:18.
- JVST – Cam Vaughn 31-yard pass from Tyler Huff (Garrison Rippa kick), 2:50. Gamecocks 28–14. Drive: 4 plays, 75 yards, 2:09.
- LT – Tru Edwards 3-yard pass from Evan Bullock (Buck Buchanan kick), 0:23. Gamecocks 28–21. Drive: 8 plays, 75 yards, 2:27.

Third quarter

- LT – Jay Wilkerson 32-yard pass from Evan Bullock (Buck Buchanan kick), 4:58. Tied 28–28. Drive: 7 plays, 66 yards, 3:45.
- LT – Team safety, 3:37. Bulldogs 30–28.

Fourth quarter

- LT – Marquis Crosby 4-yard run (Buck Buchanan kick), 10:20. Bulldogs 37–28. Drive: 9 plays, 50 yards, 4:42.
- JVST – Garrison Rippa 40-yard field goal, 5:55. Bulldogs 37–31. Drive: 12 plays, 53 yards, 4:25.
- JVST – Cam Vaughn 49-yard pass from Tyler Huff (kick failed), 0:00. Tied 37–37. Drive: 6 plays, 80 yards, 0:39.

Overtime

- JVST – Tre Stewart 11-yard run (Garrison Rippa kick). Gamecocks 44–37. Drive: 3 plays, 25 yards.

Statistics	JVST	LT
First downs	28	19
Total yards	424	410
Rushing yards	224	144
Passing yards	200	266
Turnovers	3	2
Time of possession	30:01	29:59

Team	Category	Player	Statistics
Jacksonville State	Passing	Tyler Huff	14/31, 200 yards, 2 TD, INT
Jacksonville State	Rushing	Tre Stewart	34 rushes, 166 yards, 2 TD
Jacksonville State	Receiving	Cam Vaughn	7 receptions, 130 yards, 2 TD
Louisiana Tech	Passing	Evan Bullock	16/22, 266 yards, 3 TD, INT
Louisiana Tech	Rushing	Omiri Wiggins	16 rushes, 67 yards
Louisiana Tech	Receiving	Tru Edwards	6 receptions, 142 yards, 2 TD

=== At Western Kentucky ===
Louisiana Tech Bulldogs at Western Kentucky Hilltoppers – Game summary

Quarter	1	2	3	4	Total
Bulldogs	3	6	0	3	12
Hilltoppers	0	7	0	0	7

at Houchens Industries–L. T. Smith Stadium, Bowling Green, Kentucky

- Date: November 16
- Game time: 11:00 a.m. CST
- Game weather: Sunny
- Game attendance: 13,312
- Referee: Rory Bernard
- TV announcers (CBSSN): Alex Del Barrio (play-by-play) and Taylor McHargue (analyst)
- Box score, Recap

Game information

First quarter

- LT – Buck Buchanan 35-yard field goal, 9:30. Bulldogs 3–0. Drive: 8 plays, 56 yards, 4:05.

Second quarter

- WKU – Elijah Young 7-yard run (Lucas Carneiro kick), 14:16. Hilltoppers 7–3. Drive: 14 plays, 97 yards, 5:31.
- LT – Buck Buchanan 42-yard field goal, 8:16. Hilltoppers 7–6. Drive: 12 plays, 56 yards, 5:54.
- LT – Buck Buchanan 28-yard field goal, 2:25. Bulldogs 9–7. Drive: 8 plays, 49 yards, 4:13.

Third quarter

No scoring plays

Fourth quarter

- LT – Buck Buchanan 24-yard field goal, 8:06. Bulldogs 12–7. Drive: 13 plays, 51 yards, 6:58.

Statistics	LT	WKU
First downs	18	12
Total yards	275	215
Rushing yards	209	63
Passing yards	66	152
Turnovers	0	1
Time of possession	39:38	20:22

Team	Category	Player	Statistics
Louisiana Tech	Passing	Evan Bullock	12/15, 66 yards
Louisiana Tech	Rushing	Amani Givens	17 rushes, 103 yards
Louisiana Tech	Receiving	Tru Edwards	7 receptions, 52 yards
Western Kentucky	Passing	Caden Veltkamp	18/26, 152 yards
Western Kentucky	Rushing	Caden Veltkamp	8 rushes, 17 yards
Western Kentucky	Receiving	Kisean Johnson	4 receptions, 40 yards

=== At Arkansas ===
Louisiana Tech Bulldogs at Arkansas Razorbacks – Game summary

Quarter	1	2	3	4	Total
Bulldogs	0	0	7	7	14
Razorbacks	0	14	7	14	35

at Donald W. Reynolds Razorback Stadium, Fayetteville, Arkansas

- Date: November 23
- Game time: 3:00 p.m. CST
- Game weather: Sunny, 70 °F (21 °C)
- Game attendance: 66,041
- Referee: Matt Loeffler
- TV announcers (SECN+/ESPN+): Matt Schumacker (play-by-play) and Dustin Fox (analyst)
- Box score, Recap

Game information
First quarter
- No scoring plays

Second quarter

- ARK – Isaac TeSlaa 11-yard pass from Taylen Green (Matthew Shipley kick), 5:49. Razorbacks 7–0. Drive: 13 plays, 80 yards, 5:54.
- ARK – Taylen Green 41-yard run (Matthew Shipley kick), 1:53. Razorbacks 14–0. Drive: 6 plays, 65 yards, 1:47.

Third quarter

- ARK – Isaac TeSlaa 27-yard pass from Taylen Green (Matthew Shipley kick), 9:54. Razorbacks 21–0. Drive: 1 play, 27 yards, 0:06.
- LT – Eli Finley 2-yard pass from Evan Bullock (Buck Buchanan kick), 3:59. Razorbacks 21–7. Drive: 8 plays, 42 yards, 4:04.

Fourth quarter

- ARK – Taylen Green 8-yard run (Matthew Shipley kick), 14:14. Razorbacks 28–7. Drive: 12 plays, 75 yards, 4:45.
- LT – Jimmy Holiday 20-yard pass from Evan Bullock (Buck Buchanan kick), 5:58. Razorbacks 28–14. Drive: 8 plays, 75 yards, 3:14.
- ARK – Ja'Quinden Jackson 13-yard run (Matthew Shiley kick), 3:01. Razorbacks 35–14. Drive: 7 plays, 86 yards, 2:54.

Statistics	LT	ARK
First downs	16	26
Total yards	229	454
Rushing yards	39	233
Passing yards	190	221
Turnovers	1	3
Time of possession	31:10	28:50

Team	Category	Player	Statistics
Louisiana Tech	Passing	Evan Bullock	26/43, 190 yards, 2 TD
Louisiana Tech	Rushing	Patrick Rea	1 rush, 26 yards
Louisiana Tech	Receiving	Tru Edwards	8 receptions, 53 yards
Arkansas	Passing	Taylen Green	20/37, 221 yards, 2 TD, INT
Arkansas	Rushing	Rashod Dubinion	15 rushes, 112 yards
Arkansas	Receiving	Andrew Armstrong	8 receptions, 81 yards

=== Kennesaw State ===
Kennesaw State Owls at Louisiana Tech Bulldogs – Game summary

Quarter	1	2	3	4	Total
Owls	0	0	0	0	0
Bulldogs	7	10	9	7	33

at Joe Aillet Stadium, Ruston, Louisiana

- Date: November 30
- Game time: 2:00 p.m. CST
- Game weather: Sunny, 56 °F (13 °C)
- Game attendance: 14,686
- Referee: Ron Hudson
- TV announcers (ESPN+): Lyn Rollins (play-by-play), Hek’ma Harrison (analyst) and Madison Kaufman (sideline)
- Box score, Recap

Game information

First quarter

- LT – Omiri Wiggins 4-yard run (Buck Buchanan kick), 11:41. Bulldogs 7–0. Drive: 5 plays, 26 yards, 1:59.

Second quarter

- LT – Omiri Wiggins 6-yard run (Buck Buchanan kick), 14:16. Bulldogs 14–0. Drive: 9 plays, 84 yards, 4:41.
- LT – Buck Buchanan 55-yard field goal, 0:57. Bulldogs 17–0. Drive: 9 plays, 37 yards, 3:36.

Third quarter

- LT – Team safety, 2:04. Bulldogs 19–0.
- LT – Omiri Wiggins 35-yard run (Buck Buchanan kick), 0:07. Bulldogs 26–0. Drive: 4 plays, 63 yards, 1:51.

Fourth quarter

- LT – Amani Givens 2-yard run (Buck Buchanan kick), 10:50. Bulldogs 33–0. Drive: 6 plays, 69 yards, 3:49.

Statistics	KENN	LT
First downs	8	28
Total yards	146	443
Rushing yards	58	210
Passing yards	146	443
Turnovers	0	1
Time of possession	22:43	37:17

Team	Category	Player	Statistics
Kennesaw State	Passing	Davis Bryson	10/26, 88 yards
Kennesaw State	Rushing	Michael Benefield	9 rushes, 36 yards
Kennesaw State	Receiving	Gabriel Benyard	4 receptions, 39 yards
Louisiana Tech	Passing	Evan Bullock	23/30, 233 yards
Louisiana Tech	Rushing	Omiri Wiggins	17 rushes, 129 yards, 3 TD
Louisiana Tech	Receiving	Jimmy Holiday	7 receptions, 103 yards

=== Vs. No. 22 Army (Independence Bowl) ===
2024 Independence Bowl
Louisiana Tech Bulldogs vs. No. 22 Army Black Knights – Game summary

Quarter	1	2	3	4	Total
Bulldogs	0	3	3	0	6
No. 22 Black Knights	14	7	0	6	27

at Independence Stadium, Shreveport, Louisiana

- Date: December 28
- Game time: 8:15 p.m. CST
- Game attendance: 34,283
- Referee: Jeremy Valentine
- TV announcers (ESPN): Lowell Galindo (play-by-play), Fozzy Whittaker (analyst), and Tori Petry (analyst)

Game information

First quarter

- ARMY – Bryson Daily 15-yard run (Trey Gronotte kick), 9:32. Black Knights 7–0. Drive: 8 plays, 80 yards, 4:05.
- ARMY – Hayden Reed 12-yard run (Trey Gronotte kick), 1:28. Black Knights 14–0. Drive: 10 plays, 80 yards, 5:39.

Second quarter

- LT – Drew Henderson 27-yard field goal, 14:15. Black Knights 14-3. Drive: 7 plays, 56 yards, 2:13.
- ARMY – Bryson Daily 8-yard run (Trey Gronotte kick), 1:54. Black Knights 21–3. Drive: 21 plays, 75 yards, 12:21.

Third quarter

- LT – Drew Henderson 44-yard field goal, 2:11. Black Knights 21-6. Drive: 11 plays, 39 yards, 5:33.

Fourth quarter

- ARMY – Bryson Daily 3-yard run (Two-point run conversion failed), 14:56. Black Knights 27-6. Drive: 5 plays, 75 yards, 2:15.

Statistics	LT	ARMY
First downs	11	26
Total yards	218	386
Rushing yards	49	321
Passing yards	169	65
Turnovers	1	1
Time of possession	19:52	40:08

Team	Category	Player	Statistics
Louisiana Tech	Passing	Evan Bullock	14/28, 169 yards, INT
Louisiana Tech	Rushing	Omiri Wiggins	8 carries, 40 yards
Louisiana Tech	Receiving	Tru Edwards	8 receptions, 92 yards
Army	Passing	Bryson Daily	2/9, 65 yards
Army	Rushing	Bryson Daily	27 carries, 3 TD
Army	Receiving	David Crossan	1 reception, 52 yards
