= 2024 FIU Panthers football team =

American college football season

2024 FIU Panthers football
- Conference: Conference USA
- Record: 4–8 (3–5 C-USA)
- Head coach: Mike MacIntyre (3rd season)
- Offensive coordinator: David Yost (3rd season)
- Offensive scheme: Spread
- Defensive coordinator: Jovan Dewitt (3rd season)
- Base defense: Multiple 3–4
- Home stadium: Pitbull Stadium

2024 Conference USA football standings
	Conf.			Overall
Team	W		L	W		L
Jacksonville State y$	7	–	1	9	–	5
Western Kentucky y	6	–	2	8	–	6
Sam Houston	6	–	2	10	–	3
Liberty	5	–	3	8	–	4
Louisiana Tech	4	–	4	5	–	8
UTEP	3	–	5	3	–	9
FIU	3	–	5	4	–	8
New Mexico State	2	–	6	3	–	9
Middle Tennessee	2	–	6	3	–	9
Kennesaw State*	2	–	6	2	–	10
Championship: Jacksonville State 52, Western Kentucky 12
$ – Conference champion; y – Championship game participant; * – Ineligible for postseason play due to FCS-to-FBS transition rules

The 2024 FIU Panthers football team represented Florida International University in Conference USA (C-USA) during the 2024 NCAA Division I FBS football season. The Panthers were led by Mike MacIntyre in his third year as the head coach. The Panthers played their home games at Pitbull Stadium in Miami.

On December 1, Mike MacIntyre was fired as the Panthers' head coach.

== Preseason ==
=== Conference USA media poll ===
The Conference USA preseason media prediction poll was released on July 19, 2024. The Panthers were predicted to finish eighth in the conference.

== Schedule ==
Date	Time	Opponent	Site	TV	Result	Attendance
August 31	3:30 p.m.	at Indiana*	Memorial Stadium; Bloomington, IN	BTN	L 7–31	44,150
September 7	6:00 p.m.	Central Michigan*	Pitbull Stadium; Miami, FL	ESPN+	W 52–16	17,852
September 14	6:00 p.m.	at Florida Atlantic*	FAU Stadium; Boca Raton, FL (Shula Bowl)	ESPN+	L 20–38	24,283
September 21	6:00 p.m.	Monmouth*^{†}	Pitbull Stadium; Miami, FL	ESPN+	L 42–45	17,922
September 28	6:00 p.m.	Louisiana Tech	Pitbull Stadium; Miami, FL	ESPN+	W 17–10	12,425
October 8	7:00 p.m.	at Liberty	Williams Stadium; Lynchburg, VA	CBSSN	L 24–31 ^{OT}	16,343
October 16	9:00 p.m.	at UTEP	Sun Bowl; El Paso, TX	CBSSN	L 21–30	11,373
October 22	7:30 p.m.	Sam Houston	Pitbull Stadium; Miami, FL	ESPNU	L 7–10	10,625
October 29	7:00 p.m.	New Mexico State	Pitbull Stadium; Miami, FL	CBSSN	W 34–13	9,103
November 16	2:00 p.m.	at Jacksonville State	AmFirst Stadium; Jacksonville, AL	ESPN+	L 31–34	17,688
November 23	3:00 p.m.	at Kennesaw State	Fifth Third Bank Stadium; Kennesaw, GA	ESPN+	L 26–27	6,210
November 30	2:00 p.m.	Middle Tennessee	Pitbull Stadium; Miami, FL	ESPN+	W 35–24	8,962
*Non-conference game; ^{†}Homecoming; All times are in Eastern time

== Game summaries ==
=== At Indiana ===
Game One – FIU Panthers (0-0) vs Indiana Hoosiers (0-0) – Game summary

Quarter	1	2	3	4	Total
Panthers	0	7	0	0	7
Hoosiers	14	7	3	7	31

at Memorial Stadium • Bloomington, Indiana

- Date: August 31
- Game time: 3:40 p.m. EDT
- Game weather: Cloudy 81 °F (27 °C)
- Game attendance: 44,150
- Referee: Reed Brotherton
- TV announcers (BTN): Joe Beninati (play-by-play), Matt Barkley (analyst), Shane Sparks (sideline reporter)
- IUHoosiers.com

Game information

First quarter

- 09:14 IND - Zach Horton 9-yard pass from Kurtis Rourke, (Nicolas Radicic kick) (Drive: 7 plays, 58 yards, 03:51; Indiana 7–0)
- 01:23 IND - Ty Son Lawton 13-yard run (Nicolas Radicic kick) (Drive: 9 plays, 76 yards, 04:24; Indiana 14–0)

Second quarter

- 04:53 IND - Ty Son Lawton 2-yard run (Nicolas Radicic kick) (Drive: 16 plays, 93 yards, 08:05; Indiana 21–0)
- 00:48 FIU - Rocky Beers 7-yard pass from Keyone Jenkins (Chase Gabriel kick) (Drive: 12 plays, 75 yards, 04:05; Indiana 21–7)

Third quarter

- 05:51 IND - Nicolas Radicic 35-yard field goal (Drive: 13 plays, 68 yards, 06:24; Indiana 24–7)

Fourth quarter

- 01:06 IND - Elijah Green 51-yard run (Nicolas Radicic kick) (Drive: 2 plays, 39 yards, 00:49; Indiana 31–7)

Statistics	FIU	IU
First downs	13	23
Total yards	59–182	65–414
Rushing yards	30–53	40–234
Passing yards	129	180
Passing: Comp–Att–Int	20–29–1	15–25–0
Time of possession	27:20	32:40

Team	Category	Player	Statistics
FIU	Passing	Keyone Jenkins	20/29, 129 yards, 1 TD, 1 INT
FIU	Rushing	Kejon Owens	6 carries, 36 yards
FIU	Receiving	Dean Patterson	5 receptions, 28 yards
Indiana	Passing	Kurtis Rourke	15/24, 180 yards, 1 TD
Indiana	Rushing	Elijah Green	5 carries, 82 yards, 1 TD
Indiana	Receiving	Omar Cooper Jr.	3 receptions, 45 yards

=== Central Michigan ===
Game Two – Central Michigan Chippewas (1–0) vs. FIU Panthers (0–1) – Game summary

Quarter	1	2	3	4	Total
Chippewas	0	8	8	0	16
Panthers	7	21	8	16	52

at Pitbull Stadium, Miami, FL

- Date: Saturday September 7, 2024
- Game time: 6:00 p.m. EDT
- Game weather: Sunny, 89 degrees Wind: SE @ 9 mph
- Game attendance: 17,852
- Referee: Andrew Speciale
- TV announcers (ESPN+): Steve Goldstein (Play-by-play), Kim Bokamper (Analyst)

Game information

First quarter

- 06:55 FIU - Keyone Jenkins 7-yard run (Chase Gabriel kick) (Drive: 4 plays, 33 yards, 01:59; FIU 7-0)

Second quarter

- 07:45 FIU - Eric Rivers 36-yard pass from Keyone Jenkins (Chase Gabriel kick) (Drive: 3 plays, 72 yards, 01:21; FIU 14-0)
- 02:18 FIU - Nazeviah Burris 17-yard pass from Keyone Jenkins (Chase Gabriel kick) (Drive: 6 plays, 43 yards, 03:23; FIU 21-0)
- 01:54 FIU - Brian Blades II 21-yard interception return (Chase Gabriel kick) (Drive: 2 plays, -4 yards, 00:18; FIU 28-0)
- 00:14 CMU - Gavin Harris 12-yard pass from Joe Labas (Joe Labas pass to Evan Boyd for two-point conversion) (Drive: 9 plays, 58 yards, 01:35; FIU 28-8)

Third quarter

- 06:04 FIU - Kejon Owens 26-yard run (Keyone Jenkins pass to Dean Patterson for two-point conversion) (Drive: 2 plays, 36 yards, 00:30; FIU 36-8)
- 00:39 CMU - Chris Parker 44-yard pass from Joe Labas (Joe Labas pass to Gavin Harris for two-point conversion) (Drive: 5 plays, 71 yards, 02:22; FIU 36-16)

Fourth quarter

- 12:39 FIU - Lexington Joseph 35-yard run (Two-point pass conversion failed) (Drive: 7 plays, 75 yards, 03:00; FIU 42-16)
- 06:32 FIU - Chase Gabriel 42-yard field goal (Drive: 6 plays, 13 yards, 03:35; FIU 45-16)
- 02:28 FIU - Luby Maurice Jr. 15-yard run (Chase Gabriel kick) (Drive: 2 plays, 9 yards, 00:52; FIU 52-16)

Statistics	CMU	FIU
First downs	22	15
Total yards	369	309
Rushing yards	179	185
Passing yards	190	124
Turnovers	6	0
Time of possession	34:18	25:42

Team	Category	Player	Statistics
Central Michigan	Passing	Joe Labas	20/39, 151 yards, 2 TD, 5 INT
Central Michigan	Rushing	Myles Bailey	8 carries, 54 yards
Central Michigan	Receiving	Chris Parker	3 receptions, 55 yards, 1 TD
FIU	Passing	Keyone Jenkins	10/18, 124 yards, 2 TD
FIU	Rushing	Kejone Owens	9 carries, 60 yards, TD
FIU	Receiving	Josiah Miamen	4 receptions, 54 yards

=== At Florida Atlantic (Shula Bowl) ===
Game Three – FIU Panthers (1–1) at Florida Atlantic Owls (0–2) – Game summary

Quarter	1	2	3	4	Total
Panthers	7	0	7	6	20
Owls	7	17	14	0	38

at FAU Stadium • Boca Raton, Florida

- Date: September 14th
- Game time: 6:00 p.m. EDT
- Game weather: Cloudy • Temperature: 91 °F (33 °C) • Wind: N at 7 miles per hour (11 km/h)
- Game attendance: 24,283
- Referee: Darryl DeBerry
- TV announcers (ESPN+): AJ Ricketts (play-by-play), Leger Douzable (analyst), Smacker Miles (sideline reporter)

Game information

First quarter

- (13:45) FIU – Eric Rivers 32 yard pass from Keyone Jenkins, Alejandro Prado kick (Drive: 3 plays, 64 yards, 1:08; FIU 7–0)
- (1:37) FAU – Zuberi Mobley 1 yard run, Morgan Suarez kick (Drive: 3 plays, 12 yards, 0:45; Tied 7–7)

Second quarter

- (10:17) FAU – Zuberi Mobley 72 yard run, Morgan Suarez kick (Drive: 6 plays, 92 yards, 4:43; Florida Atlantic 14–7)
- (6:40) FAU – Morgan Suarez 28 yard field goal (Drive: 5 plays, 27 yards, 2:13; Florida Atlantic 17–7)
- (0:03) FAU – Zuberi Mobley 1 yard run, Morgan Suarez kick (Drive: 9 plays, 63 yards, 1:14; Florida Atlantic 24–7)

Third quarter

- (7:37) FAU – Cam Fancher 12 yard run, Morgan Suarez kick (Drive: 14 plays, 75 yards, 7:23; Florida Atlantic 31–7)
- (4:28) FAU – CJ Campbell Jr. 2 yard run, Morgan Suarez kick (Drive: 4 plays, 30 yards, 1:23; Florida Atlantic 38–7)
- (0:08) FIU – Dean Patterson 26 yard pass from Keyone Jenkins, Alejandro Prado kick (Drive: 12 plays, 75 yards, 4:20; Florida Atlantic 38–14)

Fourth quarter

- (9:42) FIU – JuJu Lewis 16 yard pass from Keyone Jenkins, 2-point run failed (Drive: 7 plays, 80 yards, 2:16; Florida Atlantic 38–20)

Statistics	FIU	FAU
First downs	22	22
Plays–yards	60–368	78–420
Rushes–yards	25–87	52–259
Passing yards	281	161
Passing: Comp–Att–Int	21–35–3	14–26–0
Time of possession	22:01	37:59

Team	Category	Player	Statistics
FIU	Passing	Keyone Jenkins	21/35, 281 yards, 3 TD, 3 INT
FIU	Rushing	Lexington Joseph	7 carries, 37 yards
FIU	Receiving	Eric Rivers	4 receptions, 101 yards, 1 TD
Florida Atlantic	Passing	Cam Fancher	14/26, 161 yards
Florida Atlantic	Rushing	Zuberi Mobley	20 carries, 134 yards, 3 TD
Florida Atlantic	Receiving	CJ Campbell Jr.	4 receptions, 59 yards

=== Monmouth (FCS) ===
Game Four – Monmouth Hawks (FCS) (1–2) at FIU Panthers (1–2) – Game summary

Quarter	1	2	3	4	Total
Hawks (FCS)	7	14	14	10	45
Panthers	14	14	7	7	42

at Pitbull Stadium • Miami, FL

- Date: Saturday September 21, 2024
- Game time: 6:00 PM EST
- Game weather: Sunny, 90 °F (32 °C), Wind: N @ 9 mph
- Game attendance: 17,922
- Referee: Garrett Dickerson
- TV announcers (ESPN+): Steve Goldstein (Play-by-play), Corey Brooks (Analyst)

Game information

First quarter

- 09:53 FIU - Travion Barnes 85-yard interception return (Alejandro Prado kick) (Drive: 10 plays, 57 yards, 05:07; FIU 7-0)
- 04:49 FIU - Dean Patterson 1-yard pass from Keyone Jenkins (Alejandro Prado kick) (Drive: 8 plays, 57 yards, 03:33; FIU 14-0)
- 01:44 MONM - Sone Ntoh 30-yard run (Michael Calton Jr. kick) (Drive: 8 plays, 81 yards, 03:00; FIU 14-7)

Second quarter

- 10:53 FIU - Kejon Owens 2-yard run (Alejandro Prado kick) (Drive: 6 plays, 67 yards, 03:01; FIU 21-7)
- 07:03 MONM - Sone Ntoh 3-yard run (Michael Calton Jr. kick) (Drive: 9 plays, 68 yards, 03:43; FIU 21-14)
- 06:01 FIU - Juju Lewis 42-yard pass from Keyone Jenkins (Alejandro Prado kick) (Drive: 3 plays, 75 yards, 01:02; FIU 28-14)
- 01:49 MONM - TJ Speight 4-yard pass from Derek Robertson (Michael Calton Jr. kick) (Drive: 12 plays, 75 yards, 04:07; FIU 28-21)

Third quarter

- 11:10 MONM - Gavin Nelson 4-yard pass from Derek Robertson (Michael Calton Jr. kick) (Drive: 6 plays, 60 yards, 02:00; 28-28)
- 08:07 FIU - Dean Patterson 8-yard run (Alejandro Prado kick) (Drive: 6 plays, 70 yards, 02:57; FIU 35-28)
- 04:37 MONM - Rodney Nelson 59-yard run (Michael Calton Jr. kick) (Drive: 3 plays, 78 yards, 01:11; 35-35)

Fourth quarter

- 13:24 MONM - Sone Ntoh 1-yard run (Michael Calton Jr. kick) (Drive: 10 plays, 53 yards, 03:39; MONM 42-35)
- 10:12 FIU - Kejon Owens 12-yard run (Alejandro Prado kick) (Drive: 6 plays, 64 yards, 03:05; 42-42)
- 01:52 MONM - Michael Calton Jr. 43-yard field goal (Drive: 7 plays, 13 yards, 03:11; MONM 45-42)

Statistics	MONM	FIU
First downs	24	21
Total yards	540	475
Rushing yards	179	113
Passing yards	361	362
Passing: Comp–Att–Int	35-51-1	23-32-0
Time of possession	34:24	25:36

Team	Category	Player	Statistics
Monmouth	Passing	Derek Robertson	35/51, 361 yards, 2 TD, INT
Monmouth	Rushing	Rodney Nelson	14 carries, 117 yards, TD
Monmouth	Receiving	Josh Derry	7 receptions, 108 yards
FIU	Passing	Keyone Jenkins	23/32, 362 yards, 2 TD
FIU	Rushing	Kejon Owens	11 carries, 57 yards, 2 TD
FIU	Receiving	Eric Rivers	5 receptions, 101 yards

=== Louisiana Tech ===
Game Five – Louisiana Tech Bulldogs (1–2) at FIU Panthers (1–3) – Game summary

Quarter	1	2	3	4	Total
Bulldogs	0	0	10	0	10
Panthers	7	0	7	3	17

at Pitbull Stadium • Miami, FL

- Date: Saturday September 28, 2024
- Game time: 6:00 PM EST
- Game weather: Sunny • Temperature: 87 °F (31 °C) • Wind: N at 12 miles per hour (19 km/h)
- Game attendance: 12,425
- Referee: Reed Brotherton
- TV announcers (ESPN+): AJ Ricketts (play-by-play) and Zach Leston (analyst)

Game information

First quarter

- FIU – Eric Rivers 10-yard pass from Keyone Jenkins (Alejandro Prado kick), 2:26. Panthers 7–0. Drive: 13 plays, 84 yards, 7:02.

Second quarter

No scoring plays

Third quarter

- FIU – Lexington Joseph 6-yard run (Alejandro Prado kick), 10:38. Panthers 14–0. Drive: 6 plays, 56 yards, 3:04.
- LT – Jimmy Holiday 5-yard run (Buck Buchanan kick), 7:04. Panthers 14–7. Drive: 8 plays, 63 yards, 3:23.
- LT – Buck Buchanan 34-yard field goal, 2:43. Panthers 14–10. Drive: 7 plays, 37 yards, 2:13.

Fourth quarter

- FIU – Alejandro Prado 25-yard field goal, 7:08. Panthers 17–10. Drive: 9 plays, 53 yards, 5:13.

Statistics	LT	FIU
First downs	16	21
Total yards	297	304
Rushing yards	79	84
Passing yards	218	217
Passing: Comp–Att–Int	26–37–0	18–32–0
Time of possession	29:12	30:48

Team	Category	Player	Statistics
Louisiana Tech	Passing	Evan Bullock	26/37, 218 yards
Louisiana Tech	Rushing	Donerio Davenport	6 carries, 25 yards
Louisiana Tech	Receiving	Marlion Jackson	5 receptions, 81 yards
FIU	Passing	Keyone Jenkins	17/31, 208 yards, TD
FIU	Rushing	Lexington Joseph	13 carries, 73 yards, TD
FIU	Receiving	Eric Rivers	7 receptions, 97 yards, TD

=== at Liberty ===
Game Six – FIU Panthers (2–3) at Liberty Flames (4–0) – Game summary

Quarter	1	2	3	4	OT	Total
Panthers	3	7	0	14	0	24
Flames	3	14	0	7	7	31

at Williams Stadium • Lynchburg, VA

- Date: Tuesday, October 8, 2024
- Game time: 7:00 p.m. EST
- Game weather: Sunny • Temperature: 61 °F (16 °C) • Wind: SE at 3 miles per hour (4.8 km/h)
- Game attendance: 16,343
- Referee: Garrett Dickerson
- TV announcers (CBSSN): Jordan Kent (play-by-play) and Donte Whitner (analyst)

Game information

First quarter

- (8:34) LIB – Colin Karhu 28-yard field goal (Drive: 7 plays, 66 yards, 3:43; Liberty 3–0)
- (4:16) FIU – Alejandro Prado 31-yard field goal (Drive: 10 plays, 48 yards, 4:10; Tied 3–3)

Second quarter

- (14:50) FIU – Dean Patterson 17-yard run, Alejandro Prado kick (Drive: 5 plays, 56 yards, 2:02; FIU 10–3)
- (8:15) LIB – Quinton Cooley 4-yard run, Colin Karhu kick (Drive: 11 plays, 59 yards, 6:27; Tied 10–10)
- (0:20) LIB – Kaidon Salter 20-yard run, Colin Karhu kick (Drive: 10 plays, 73 yards, 2:26; Liberty 17–10)

Third quarter

No scoring plays

Fourth quarter

- (10:43) LIB – Quinton Cooley 9-yard run, Colin Karhu kick (Drive: 8 plays, 82 yards, 4:12; Liberty 24–10)
- (6:23) FIU – Kejon Owens 3-yard run, Alejandro Prado kick (Drive: 9 plays, 66 yards, 4:13; Liberty 24–17)
- (1:42) FIU – Keyone Jenkins 1-yard run, Alejandro Prado kick (Drive: 9 plays, 61 yards, 3:44; Tied 24–24)

Overtime

- (0:00) LIB – Kaidon Salter 9-yard run, Colin Karhu kick (Drive: 4 plays, 25 yards, 15:00; Liberty 31–24)

Statistics	FIU	LIB
First downs	18	21
Total yards	344	406
Rushing yards	99	281
Passing yards	245	125
Passing: Comp–Att–Int	19–29–0	9–16–1
Time of possession	29:18	30:42

Team	Category	Player	Statistics
FIU	Passing	Keyone Jenkins	19/29, 245 yards, INT
FIU	Rushing	Kejon Owens	15 carries, 52 yards, TD
FIU	Receiving	Dean Patterson	6 receptions, 90 yards
Liberty	Passing	Kaidon Salter	9/16, 125 yards
Liberty	Rushing	Quinton Cooley	29 carries, 174 yards, 2 TD
Liberty	Receiving	Reese Smith	4 receptions, 68 yards

=== at UTEP ===
Game Seven – FIU Panthers (2–4) vs. UTEP Miners (0–6) – Game summary

Quarter	1	2	3	4	Total
Panthers	0	0	0	0	0
Miners	0	0	0	0	0

at Sun Bowl, El Paso, TX

- Date: Wednesday October 16, 2024
- Game time: 9:00 p.m. EST
- Game weather: Sunny, 72 degrees, Wind: NW @ 18 mph
- Game attendance: 11,373
- Referee: Ron Hudson
- TV announcers (CBSSN): Dave Ryan (play-by-play) and Brock Vereen (analyst)

Game information

First quarter

- (11:49) FIU - Dean Patterson 16-yard pass from Keyone Jenkins, Alejandro Prado kick (Drive: 3 plays, 30 yards, 1:18, FIU 7-0)
- (10:31) UTEP - Buzz Flabiano 27-yard field goal (Drive: 5 plays, 65 yards, 1:18, FIU 7-3)

Second quarter

- (14:29) UTEP - Skyler Locklear 3-yard run, Buzz Flabiano kick (Drive: 2 plays, 10 yards, 1:03, UTEP 10-7)
- (6:17) FIU - Eric Rivers 33-yard pass from Amari Jones, Alejandro Prado kick (Drive: 6 plays, 67 yards, 2:46, FIU 14-10)
- (0:25) UTEP - Jevon Jackson 22-yard pass from Skyler Locklear, Buzz Flabiano kick (Drive: 4 plays, 42 yards, 1:11, UTEP 17-14)

Third quarter

- (10:00) UTEP - Buzz Flabiano 44-yard field goal (Drive: 5 plays, 22 yards, 1:14, UTEP 20-14)
- (0:38) FIU - Kejon Owens 8-yard run, Alejandro Prado kick (Drive: 1 play, 8 yards, 0:05, FIU 21-20)

Fourth quarter

- (11:29) UTEP - Jevon Jackson 1-yard run, Buzz Flabiano kick (Drive: 10 plays, 76 yards, 4:03, UTEP 27-21)
- (2:30) UTEP - Buzz Flabiano 39-yard field goal (Drive: 6 plays, 16 yards, 2:26, UTEP 30-21)

Statistics	FIU	UTEP
First downs	14	20
Total yards	287	372
Rushing yards	85	211
Passing yards	202	161
Turnovers	4	2
Time of possession	29:56	30:04

Team	Category	Player	Statistics
FIU	Passing	Amari Jones	6/11, 92 yards, TD, INT
FIU	Rushing	Kejon Owens	9 carries, 36 yards, TD
FIU	Receiving	Eric Rivers	5 receptions, 91 yards, TD
UTEP	Passing	Skyler Locklear	14/23, 161 yards, TD, INT
UTEP	Rushing	Jevon Jackson	26 carries, 148 yards, TD
UTEP	Receiving	Kenny Odom	3 receptions, 75 yards

=== Sam Houston ===
Game Eight – Sam Houston Bearkats (5–2) vs. FIU Panthers (2–5) – Game summary

Quarter	1	2	3	4	Total
Bearkats	0	0	7	3	10
Panthers	0	0	0	7	7

at Pitbull Stadium, Miami, FL

- Date: Tuesday October 22, 2024
- Game time: 7:30 p.m. EST
- Game weather: Cloudy, 79 °F (26 °C)
- Game attendance: 10,626
- Referee: Rodney Burnette
- TV announcers (ESPNU): Matt Schumacker (play-by-play) and Dustin Fox (analyst)

Game information

First quarter

No scoring plays

Second quarter

No scoring plays

Third quarter

- SHSU – DJ McKinney 1-yard rush, (Christian Pavon kick), 6:38. Drive: 2 plays, 3 yards, 0:46. Bearkats 7–0.

Fourth quarter

- FIU – Eric Rivers 28-yard pass from Chayden Peery, (Alejandro Prado kick), 14:55. Drive: 12 plays, 65 yards, 6:43. Tie 7–7.
- SHSU – Pavon Christian 20-yard field goal, 1:57. Drive: 12 plays, 79 yards, 6:06. Bearkats 10–7.

Statistics	SHSU	FIU
First downs	13	11
Total yards	210	200
Rushing yards	134	126
Passing yards	76	74
Turnovers	0	1
Time of possession	31:54	28:06

Team	Category	Player	Statistics
Sam Houston	Passing	Jase Bauer	14/21, 76 yards
Sam Houston	Rushing	Jase Bauer	15 carries, 72 yards
Sam Houston	Receiving	Simeon Evans	5 receptions, 35 yards
FIU	Passing	Chayden Peery	7/12, 58 yards, TD
FIU	Rushing	Shomari Lawrence	8 carries, 44 yards
FIU	Receiving	Eric Rivers	3 receptions, 42 yards, TD

=== New Mexico State ===
Game Nine – New Mexico State Aggies (2–5) vs. FIU Panthers (2–6) – Game summary

Quarter	1	2	3	4	Total
Aggies	0	6	0	7	13
Panthers	0	7	13	14	34

at Pitbull Stadium, Miami, FL

- Date: Tuesday October 29, 2024
- Game time: 7:00 p.m. EST
- Game weather: Cloudy, 81 °F (27 °C)
- Game attendance: 9,103
- Referee: Douglas Mercer
- TV announcers (CBSSN): Dave Ryan (play-by-play) and Donte Whitner (analyst)

Game information

First quarter

No scoring plays

Second quarter

- NMSU – Abraham Montano 57-yard field goal, 13:30. Aggies 3–0. Drive: 7 plays, 40 yards, 3:55.
- FIU – Eric Rivers 52-yard pass from Keyone Jenkins (Alejandro Prado kick), 13:00. Panthers 7–3. Drive: 2 plays, 73 yards, 0:23.
- NMSU – Abraham Montano 54-yard field goal, 0:10. Panthers 7–6. Drive: 4 plays, 5 yards, 0:37.

Third quarter

- FIU – Alejandro Prado 24-yard field goal, 10:16. Panthers 10–6. Drive: 10 plays, 69 yards, 4:44.
- FIU – Eric Rivers 51-yard pass from Keyone Jenkins (Alejandro Prado kick), 7:49. Panthers 17–6. Drive: 3 plays, 64 yards, 0:56.
- FIU – Alejandro Prado 38-yard field goal, 5:32. Panthers 20–6. Drive: 4 plays, 3 yards, 1:23.

Fourth quarter

- NMSU – Mike Washington 27-yard run (Abraham Montano kick), 14:14. Panthers 20–13. Drive: 3 plays, 43 yards, 0:58.
- FIU – Dean Patterson 2-yard pass from Keyone Jenkins (Alejandro Prado kick), 7:45. Panthers 27–13. Drive: 14 plays, 75 yards, 6:29.
- FIU – Eric Rivers 62-yard pass from Keyone Jenkins (Alejandro Prado kick), 3:49. Panthers 34–13. Drive: 5 plays, 84 yards, 2:33.

Statistics	NMSU	FIU
First downs	15	18
Total yards	246	438
Rushing yards	216	100
Passing yards	30	338
Turnovers	2	0
Time of possession	31:02	28:58

Team	Category	Player	Statistics
New Mexico State	Passing	Santino Marucci	2/4, 18 yards, INT
New Mexico State	Rushing	Mike Washington	11 carries, 88 yards, TD
New Mexico State	Receiving	P. J. Johnson III	2 receptions, 14 yards
FIU	Passing	Keyone Jenkins	18/27, 338 yards, 4 TD
FIU	Rushing	Kejon Owens	13 carries, 39 yards
FIU	Receiving	Eric Rivers	11 receptions, 295 yards, 3 TD

=== at Jacksonville State ===
Game Ten – FIU Panthers (3–6) vs. Jacksonville State Gamecocks (6–3) – Game summary

Quarter	1	2	3	4	Total
Panthers	3	14	7	7	31
Gamecocks	3	17	0	14	34

at AmFirst Stadium, Jacksonville, AL

- Date: Saturday November 16, 2024
- Game time: 2:00 p.m. EST
- Game weather: Sunny • Temperature: 65 °F (18 °C) • Wind: NW 2 miles per hour (3.2 km/h)
- Game attendance: 17,688
- Referee: Reed Brotherton
- TV announcers (ESPN+): Eli Gold (play-by-play) and Bill Clark (analyst)

Game information

First quarter

- (9:02) FIU – Alejandro Prado 36-yard field goal (Drive: 13 plays, 57 yards, 5:58; FIU 3–0)
- (4:20) JVST – Garrison Rippa 31-yard field goal (Drive: 12 plays, 62 yards, 4:42; Tied 3–3)

Second quarter

- (14:54) FIU – Devonte Lyons 11-yard run, Alejandro Prado kick (Drive: 9 plays, 75 yards, 4:26; FIU 10–3)
- (11:16) JVST – Tyler Huff 10-yard run, Garrison Rippa kick (Drive: 9 plays, 75 yards, 3:38; Tied 10–10)
- (4:44) JVST – Tre Stewart 3-yard run, Garrison Rippa kick (Drive: 7 plays, 68 yards, 3:27; Jacksonville State 17–10)
- (1:45) FIU – Shomari Lawrence 3-yard run, Alejandro Prado kick (Drive: 7 plays, 75 yards, 2:59; Tied 17–17)
- (0:00) JVST – Garrison Rippa 42-yard field goal (Drive: 11 plays, 51 yards, 1:47; Jacksonville State 20–17)

Third quarter

- (7:37) FIU – Eric Rivers 5-yard pass from Keyone Jenkins, Alejandro Prado kick (Drive: 13 plays, 74 yards, 6:20; FIU 24–20)

Fourth quarter

- (14:22) JVST – Sean Brown 56-yard pass from Tyler Huff, Garrison Rippa kick (Drive: 2 plays, 60 yards, 0:31; Jacksonville State 27–24)
- (12:25) FIU – Antonio Ferguson 39-yard pass from Keyone Jenkins, Alejandro Prado kick (Drive: 4 plays, 75 yards, 1:57; FIU 31–27)
- (9:55) JVST – Tre Stewart 56-yard run, Garrison Rippa kick (Drive: 8 plays, 76 yards, 2:23; Jacksonville State 34–31)

Statistics	FIU	JVST
First downs	25	22
Total yards	431	445
Rushing yards	173	234
Passing yards	258	211
Turnovers	1	0
Time of possession	31:32	28:28

Team	Category	Player	Statistics
FIU	Passing	Keyone Jenkins	21/34, 258 yards, 2 TD
FIU	Rushing	Devonte Lyons	12 carries, 88 yards, TD
FIU	Receiving	Dean Patterson	9 receptions, 116 yards
Jacksonville State	Passing	Tyler Huff	15/28, 211 yards, TD
Jacksonville State	Rushing	Tre Stewart	22 carries, 136 yards, 2 TD
Jacksonville State	Receiving	Sean Brown	1 reception, 56 yards, TD

=== at Kennesaw State ===
Game Eleven – FIU Panthers (3–7) vs. Kennesaw State Owls (1–9) – Game summary

Quarter	1	2	3	4	Total
Panthers	0	20	6	0	26
Owls	3	14	0	10	27

at Fifth Third Bank Stadium, Kennesaw, GA

- Date: Saturday November 23, 2024
- Game time: 3:00 p.m. EST
- Game weather: Sunny, 58 °F (14 °C)
- Game attendance: 6,210
- Referee: Rodney Burnette
- TV announcers (ESPN+): Nolan Alexander (play-by-play), Barclay Miller (analyst) and Maria Martin (sideline)

Game information

First quarter

- (12:13) KENN – Austin Welch 36 yard field goal (Drive: 5 plays, 46 yards, 2:40; KENN 3–0)

Second quarter

- (10:19) KENN – Davis Bryson 5 yard run, Austin Welch kick (Drive: 9 plays, 82 yards, 4:48; KENN 10–0)
- (6:54) FIU – Eric Rivers 18 yard pass from Keyone Jenkins (Drive: 5 plays, 75 yards, 3:25; KENN 10–6)
- (3:48) KENN – Preston Daniels 3 yard run, Austin Welch kick (Drive: 7 plays, 60 yards, 3:04; KENN 17–6)
- (2:18) FIU – Dean Patterson 20 yard pass from Keyone Jenkins, Robert Czeremcha kick (Drive: 3 plays, 71 yards, 1:24; KENN 17–13)
- (1:00) FIU – Eric Rivers 42 yard pass from Keyone Jenkins, Robert Czeremcha kick (Drive: 4 plays, 70 yards, 0:45; FIU 20–17)

Third quarter

- (11:23) FIU – Robert Czeremcha 36 yard field goal (Drive: 7 plays, 31 yards, 3:28; FIU 23–17)
- (9:10) FIU – Robert Czeremcha 34 yard field goal (Drive: 4 plays, 7 yards, 2:05; FIU 26–17)

Fourth quarter

- (5:59) KENN – Davis Bryson 19 yard run, Austin Welch kick (Drive: 3 plays, 51 yards, 1:15; FIU 26–24)
- (1:04) KENN – Austin Welch 19 yard field goal (Drive: 8 plays, 32 yards, 2:31; KENN 27–26)

Statistics	FIU	KENN
First downs	15	20
Total yards	400	358
Rushing yards	196	172
Passing yards	204	186
Turnovers	2	2
Time of possession	31:27	28:33

Team	Category	Player	Statistics
FIU	Passing	Keyone Jenkins	12/22, 204 yards, 3 TD, INT
FIU	Rushing	Devonte Lyons	16 carries, 99 yards
FIU	Receiving	Eric Rivers	7 receptions, 125 yards, 2 TD
Kennesaw State	Passing	Davis Bryson	17/29, 185 yards
Kennesaw State	Rushing	Qua Ashley	14 carries, 61 yards
Kennesaw State	Receiving	Carson Kent	4 receptions, 56 yards

=== Middle Tennessee ===
Game Twelve – Middle Tennessee Blue Raiders (3–8) vs. FIU Panthers (3–8) – Game summary

Quarter	1	2	3	4	Total
Blue Raiders	0	17	0	7	24
Panthers	14	14	0	7	35

at Pitbull Stadium, Miami, FL

- Date: Saturday November 30, 2024
- Game time: 2:00 p.m. EST
- Game weather: Sunny, 81 degrees, Wind: N @ 10 mph
- Game attendance: 8,962
- Referee: Rory Bernard
- TV announcers (ESPN+): Corey Brooks (play-by-play) and Zach Letson (analyst)

Game information

First quarter

- 09:48 FIU - Lexington Joseph 1-yard run (Robert Czeremcha kick) (Drive: 11 plays, 70 yards, 05:07; FIU 7-0)
- 02:02 FIU - Devonte Lyons 21-yard run (Robert Czeremcha kick) (Drive: 13 plays, 68 yards, 07:02; FIU 14-0)

Second quarter

- 10:40 MTSU - Holden Willis 56-yard pass from Nicholas Vattiato (Zeke Rankin kick) (Drive: 4 plays, 86 yards, 02:10; FIU 14-7)
- 08:04 FIU - Dean Patterson 19-yard pass from Keyone Jenkins (Robert Czeremcha kick) (Drive: 6 plays, 76 yards, 02:31; FIU 21-7)
- 06:14 FIU - Dean Patterson 38-yard pass from Keyone Jenkins (Robert Czeremcha kick) (Drive: 2 plays, 68 yards, 00:47; FIU 28-7)
- 3:34 MTSU - Holden Willis 37-yard pass from Nicholas Vattiato (Zeke Rankin kick) (Drive: 5 plays, 76 yards, 02:34; FIU 28-14)
- 0:26 MTSU - Zeke Rankin 35-yard field goal (Drive: 11 plays, 56 yards, 02:13; FIU 28-17)

Third quarter

No scoring plays

Fourth quarter

- 11:01 FIU - Eric Rivers 50-yard pass from Keyone Jenkins (Robert Czeremcha kick) (Drive: 6 plays, 81 yards, 01:51; FIU 35-17)
- 07:23 MTSU - Jekail Middlebrook 1-yard run (Zeke Rankin kick) (Drive: 9 plays, 62 yards, 03:30; FIU 35-24)

Statistics	MTSU	FIU
First downs	17	22
Total yards	377	463
Rushing yards	121	144
Passing yards	256	319
Turnovers	1	0
Time of possession	26:20	33:40

Team	Category	Player	Statistics
Middle Tennessee	Passing	Nicholas Vattiato	21/33, 256 yards, 2 TD, INT
Middle Tennessee	Rushing	Jekail Middlebrook	10 carries, 41 yards, TD
Middle Tennessee	Receiving	Holden Willis	6 receptions, 123 yards, 2 TD
FIU	Passing	Keyone Jenkins	19/27, 319 yards, 3 TD
FIU	Rushing	Devonte Lyons	15 carries, 101 yards, TD
FIU	Receiving	Eric Rivers	7 receptions, 117 yards, TD
