= 2024 New Mexico State Aggies football team =

American college football season

2024 New Mexico State Aggies football
- Conference: Conference USA
- Record: 3–9 (2–6 C-USA)
- Head coach: Tony Sanchez (1st season)
- Offensive coordinator: Tyler Wright (1st season; first 4 games); Andrew Mitchell (interim; remainder of season)
- Offensive scheme: Multiple
- Defensive coordinator: Joe Morris (1st season)
- Base defense: 3–3–5 or 4–2–5
- Home stadium: Aggie Memorial Stadium

2024 Conference USA football standings
	Conf.			Overall
Team	W		L	W		L
Jacksonville State y$	7	–	1	9	–	5
Western Kentucky y	6	–	2	8	–	6
Sam Houston	6	–	2	10	–	3
Liberty	5	–	3	8	–	4
Louisiana Tech	4	–	4	5	–	8
UTEP	3	–	5	3	–	9
FIU	3	–	5	4	–	8
New Mexico State	2	–	6	3	–	9
Middle Tennessee	2	–	6	3	–	9
Kennesaw State*	2	–	6	2	–	10
Championship: Jacksonville State 52, Western Kentucky 12
$ – Conference champion; y – Championship game participant; * – Ineligible for postseason play due to FCS-to-FBS transition rules

The 2024 New Mexico State Aggies football team represented New Mexico State University in Conference USA (C-USA) during the 2024 NCAA Division I FBS football season. The Aggies were led by Tony Sanchez in his first year as the program's head coach. The Aggies played home games at Aggie Memorial Stadium, located in Las Cruces, New Mexico.

This was New Mexico State's first season since 2021 without Diego Pavia as their starting quarterback. Pavia, having led New Mexico State to a 10–5 2023 season that included an upset win against the Auburn Tigers, transferred to the Vanderbilt Commodores.

== Coaching changes ==
Following the conclusion of the 2023 season, second-year head coach Jerry Kill announced that he would be stepping down. Kill saw one of the largest turnarounds in college football history, leading the Aggies to bowl appearances in both of his seasons including a 10-win season in 2023, the program's first double-digit winning season since 1960. Wide receivers coach Tony Sanchez was named the Aggies' new head coach. Special teams coordinator/tight ends coach Tyler Wright was promoted to offensive coordinator while Sam Houston defensive coordinator Joe Morris, originally hired as the Aggies' defensive line coach, was later named defensive coordinator after incumbent defensive coordinator Nate Dreiling left for Utah State.

On October 11, Wright was fired two weeks after a report on the presence of over 150 racist, sexist and homophobic posts on his X account made before joining New Mexico State's coaching staff. Wright was indefinitely suspended while New Mexico State investigated the posts and missed games against New Mexico and Jacksonville State before being dismissed. Offensive line coach Andrew Mitchell assumed play-calling duties on an interim basis during the investigation and remained in the role after Wright's firing.

== Preseason ==
=== C-USA media poll ===
The Conference USA preseason media poll was released on July 19. The Aggies were predicted to finish tied for fifth.

== Schedule ==
Date	Time	Opponent	Site	TV	Result	Attendance
August 31	7:00 p.m.	Southeast Missouri State*	Aggie Memorial Stadium; Las Cruces, NM	ESPN+	W 23–16	10,738
September 7	8:15 p.m.	Liberty	Aggie Memorial Stadium; Las Cruces, NM	ESPN2	L 24–30	16,562
September 14	8:30 p.m.	at Fresno State*	Valley Children's Stadium; Fresno, CA	TruTV	L 0–48	39,079
September 21	5:00 p.m.	at Sam Houston	Bowers Stadium; Huntsville, TX	ESPN+	L 11–31	13,059
September 28	6:00 p.m.	New Mexico*	Aggie Memorial Stadium; Las Cruces, NM (Rio Grande Rivalry)	ESPN+	L 40–50	21,062
October 9	5:30 p.m.	at Jacksonville State	AmFirst Stadium; Jacksonville, AL	ESPN2	L 13–54	16,555
October 15	7:00 p.m.	Louisiana Tech	Aggie Memorial Stadium; Las Cruces, NM	ESPNU	W 33–30 ^{2OT}	9,671
October 29	5:00 p.m.	at FIU	Pitbull Stadium; Miami, FL	CBSSN	L 13–34	9,103
November 9	4:00 p.m.	Western Kentucky^{†}	Aggie Memorial Stadium; Las Cruces, NM	ESPN+	L 28–41	12,710
November 16	5:45 p.m.	at No. 15 Texas A&M*	Kyle Field; College Station, TX	SECN	L 3–38	105,815
November 23	12:30 p.m.	at Middle Tennessee	Johnny "Red" Floyd Stadium; Murfreesboro, TN	ESPN+	W 36–21	10,123
November 30	2:00 p.m.	UTEP	Aggie Memorial Stadium; Las Cruces, NM (Battle of I-10)	ESPN+	L 35–42	15,358
*Non-conference game; ^{†}Homecoming; Rankings from AP Poll and CFP Rankings released prior to game; All times are in Mountain time

== Game summaries ==
=== Southeast Missouri State ===
Southeast Missouri State Redhawks (FCS) at New Mexico State Aggies – Game summary

Quarter	1	2	3	4	Total
Redhawks (FCS)	7	3	3	3	16
Aggies	0	10	0	13	23

at Aggie Memorial Stadium, Las Cruces, New Mexico

- Date: August 31
- Game time: 7:00 p.m. MDT
- Game weather: Sunny, 90 °F (32 °C)
- Game attendance: 10,738
- Referee: Garrett Dickerson
- TV announcers (ESPN+): Adam Young and Danny Knee
- Box score, Recap

Game information

First quarter

- SEMO – Dorian Anderson 51-yard pass from Paxton DeLaurent (D. C. Pippin kick), 2:03. Redhawks 7–0. Drive: 7 plays, 80 yards, 2:45.

Second quarter

- NMSU – Seth McGowan 14-yard run (Abraham Montano kick), 11:04. Tied 7–7. Drive: 13 plays, 75 yards, 5:59.
- SEMO – D. C. Pippin 37-yard field goal Redhawks 10–7. Drive: 9 plays, 56 yards, 3:56.
- NMSU – Abraham Montano 24-yard field goal, 0:40. Tied 10–10. Drive: 16 plays, 72 yards, 6:21.

Third quarter

- SEMO – D. C. Pippin 53-yard field goal, 9:22. Redhawks 13–10. Drive: 7 plays, 25 yards, 1:46.

Fourth quarter

- SEMO – D. C. Pippin 48-yard field goal, 14:56. Redhawks 16–10. Drive: 7 plays, 19 yards, 2:36.
- NMSU – Paxton DeLaurent intentional grounding in own end zone, 11:44. Redhawks 16–12.
- NMSU – Abraham Montano 51-yard field goal, 6:07. Redhawks 16–15. Drive: 9 plays, 36 yards, 7:31.
- NMSU – Seth McGowan 3-yard run (Parker Awad run), 1:57. Aggies 23–16. Drive: 6 plays, 34 yards, 2:12.

Statistics	SEMO	NMSU
First downs	15	20
Total yards	352	270
Rushing yards	57	210
Passing yards	295	60
Turnovers	1	1
Time of possession	37:24	33:36

Team	Category	Player	Statistics
Southeast Missouri State	Passing	Paxton DeLaurent	27/45, 295 yards, TD, INT
Southeast Missouri State	Rushing	Steven Lewis	1 rush, 27 yards
Southeast Missouri State	Receiving	Dorian Anderson	6 receptions, 115 yards, TD
New Mexico State	Passing	Parker Awad	5/18, 37 yards, INT
New Mexico State	Rushing	Seth McGowan	11 rushes, 87 yards, 2 TD
New Mexico State	Receiving	PJ Johnson III	2 receptions, 35 yards

=== Liberty ===
Liberty Flames at New Mexico State Aggies – Game summary

Quarter	1	2	3	4	Total
Flames	3	6	0	21	30
Aggies	10	7	0	7	24

at Aggie Memorial Stadium, Las Cruces, New Mexico

- Date: September 7
- Game time: 8:15 p.m. MDT
- Game weather: Sunny, 85 °F (29 °C)
- Game attendance: 16,562
- Referee: Rodney Burnette
- TV announcers (ESPN2): Brian Custer, Rod Gilmore and Lauren Sisler
- Box score, Recap

Game information

First quarter

- NMSU – Abraham Montano 29-yard field goal, 7:23. Aggies 3–0. Drive: 9 plays, 47 yards, 4:16.
- NMSU – Monte Watkins 64-yard pass from Parker Awad (Abraham Montano kick), 5:39. Aggies 10–0. Drive: 1 play, 64 yards, 0:12.
- LIB – Colin Karhu 39-yard field goal, 2:53. Aggies 10–3. Drive: 5 plays, 54 yards, 2:46.

Second quarter

- NMSU – Seth McGowan 5-yard pass from Parker Awad (Abraham Montano kick), 13:15. Aggies 17–3. Drive: 9 plays, 75 yards, 4:38.
- LIB – Colin Karhu 31-yard field goal, 5:55. Aggies 17–6. Drive: 8 plays, 73 yards, 3:31.
- LIB – Colin Karhu 29-yard field goal, 0:37. Aggies 17–9. Drive: 12 plays, 41 yards, 2:56.

Third quarter

- No scoring plays

Fourth quarter

- LIB – C. J. Bazile Jr. 22-yard fumble return (Kaidon Salter run), 9:45. Aggies 17–15.
- NMSU – Parker Awad 2-yard run (Abraham Montano kick), 7:42. Aggies 24–15. Drive: 4 plays, 65 yards, 1:55.
- LIB – Quinton Cooley 27-yard run (Colin Karhu kick), 5:12. Aggies 24–22. Drive: 6 plays, 82 yards, 2:26.
- LIB – Quinton Cooley 44-yard run (Kaidon Salter pass to Reese Smith), 1:05. Flames 30–24. Drive: 7 plays, 90 yards, 1:54.

Statistics	LIB	NMSU
First downs	18	18
Total yards	473	275
Rushing yards	217	117
Passing yards	256	158
Turnovers	0	1
Time of possession	28:56	31:04

Team	Category	Player	Statistics
Liberty	Passing	Kaidon Salter	16/29, 256 yards
Liberty	Rushing	Quinton Cooley	12 rushes, 111 yards, 2 TD
Liberty	Receiving	Treon Sibley	5 receptions, 155 yards
New Mexico State	Passing	Parker Awad	9/22, 158 yards, 2 TD
New Mexico State	Rushing	Seth McGowan	15 rushes, 66 yards
New Mexico State	Receiving	Monte Watkins	1 reception, 64 yards, TD

=== at Fresno State ===
New Mexico State Aggies at Fresno State Bulldogs – Game summary

Quarter	1	2	3	4	Total
Aggies	0	0	0	0	0
Bulldogs	14	17	17	0	48

at Valley Children's Stadium, Fresno, California

- Date: September 14
- Game time: 8:30 p.m. MDT/7:30 p.m. PDT
- Game weather: Sunny, 90 °F (32 °C)
- Game attendance: 39,079
- Referee: Christian Watson
- TV announcers (TruTV): J. B. Long and Mike Golic Jr.
- Box score, Recap

Game information

First quarter

- FRES – Mac Dalena 69-yard pass from Mikey Keene (Dylan Lynch kick), 12:04. Bulldogs 7–0. Drive: 2 plays, 72 yards, 0:39.
- FRES – Elijah Gilliam 4-yard run (Dylan Lynch kick), 9:55. Bulldogs 14–0. Drive: 2 plays, 70 yards, 0:18.

Second quarter

- FRES – Malik Sherrod 7-yard run (Dylan Lynch kick), 11:08. Bulldogs 21–0. Drive: 6 plays, 68 yards, 2:54.
- FRES – Mac Dalena 13-yard pass from Mikey Keene (Dylan Lynch kick), 4:20. Bulldogs 28–0. Drive: 6 plays, 81 yards, 2:15.
- FRES – Dylan Lynch 36-yard field goal, 0:59. Bulldogs 31–0. Drive: 9 plays, 53 yards, 2:19.

Third quarter

- FRES – Elijah Gilliam 1-yard run (Dylan Lynch kick), 12:14. Bulldogs 38–0. Drive: 6 plays, 75 yards, 2:46.
- FRES – Dylan Lynch 40-yard field goal, 9:44. Bulldogs 41–0. Drive: 4 plays, 5 yards, 1:30.
- FRES – Joshua Wood 2-yard run (Dylan Lynch kick), 5:15. Bulldogs 48–0. Drive: 8 plays, 45 yards, 3:29.

Fourth quarter

- No scoring plays

Statistics	NMSU	FRES
First downs	11	20
Total yards	138	525
Rushing yards	77	281
Passing yards	61	244
Turnovers	3	0
Time of possession	30:00	30:00

Team	Category	Player	Statistics
New Mexico State	Passing	Parker Awad	6/15, 48 yards, INT
New Mexico State	Rushing	Seth McGowan	11 carries, 47 yards
New Mexico State	Receiving	Jordan Smith	2 receptions, 31 yards
Fresno State	Passing	Mikey Keene	12/22, 221 yards, 2 TD
Fresno State	Rushing	Malik Sherrod	15 carries, 113 yards, TD
Fresno State	Receiving	Mac Dalena	2 receptions, 82 yards, 2 TD

=== at Sam Houston ===
New Mexico State Aggies at Sam Houston Bearkats – Game summary

Quarter	1	2	3	4	Total
Aggies	3	0	0	8	11
Bearkats	14	7	0	10	31

at Bowers Stadium, Huntsville, Texas

- Date: September 21
- Game time: 5:00 p.m. MDT/6:00 p.m. CDT
- Game weather: Sunny, 94 °F (34 °C)
- Game attendance: 13,059
- Referee: Reed Brotherson
- TV announcers (ESPN+): Tom Franklin and Ken Moore
- Box score, Recap

Game information
First quarter
- NMSU – Abraham Montano 32-yard field goal, 6:36. Aggies 3–0. Drive: 13 plays, 58 yards, 4:30.
- SHSU – Hunter Watson 46-yard run (Christian Pavon kick), 5:31. Bearkats 7–3. Drive: 4 plays, 75 yards, 1:05.
- SHSU – Jay Ducker 1-yard run (Christian Pavon kick), 0:35. Bearkats 14–3. Drive: 7 plays, 35 yards, 1:50.

Second quarter

- SHSU – Hunter Watson 8-yard run (Christian Pavon kick), 6:26. Bearakts 21–3. Drive: 17 plays, 80 yards, 8:20.

Third quarter

- No scoring plays

Fourth quarter

- SHSU – Simeon Evans 20-yard pass from Jase Bauer (Christian Pavon kick), 13:29. Bearkats 28–3. Drive: 13 plays, 89 yards, 6:36.
- NMSU – Jerry Lydiatt 3-yard pass from Santino Marucci (Santino Marucci pass to Seth McGowan), 8:35. Bearkats 28–11. Drive: 12 plays, 74 yards, 4:47.
- SHSU – Christian Pavon 46-yard field goal, 1:51. Bearkats 31–11. Drive: 13 plays, 45 yards, 6:44.

Statistics	NMSU	SHSU
First downs	12	24
Total yards	152	382
Rushing yards	78	280
Passing yards	74	102
Turnovers	3	2
Time of possession	23:22	36:38

Team	Category	Player	Statistics
New Mexico State	Passing	Santino Marucci	14/29, 74 yards, TD, 2 INT
New Mexico State	Rushing	Seth McGowan	12 rushes, 50 yards
New Mexico State	Receiving	T. J. Pride	5 receptions, 33 yards
Sam Houston	Passing	Hunter Watson	9/21, 64 yards, 2 INT
Sam Houston	Rushing	Hunter Watson	12 rushes, 116 yards, 2 TD
Sam Houston	Receiving	Noah Smith	4 receptions, 38 yards

=== New Mexico ===
New Mexico Lobos at New Mexico State Aggies – Game summary

Quarter	1	2	3	4	Total
Lobos	7	14	9	20	50
Aggies	7	3	7	23	40

at Aggie Memorial Stadium, Las Cruces, New Mexico

- Date: September 28
- Game time: 6:00 p.m. MDT
- Game weather: Sunny, 93 °F (34 °C)
- Game attendance: 21,062
- Referee: Rory Bernard
- TV announcers (ESPN+): Adam Young and Danny Knee
- Box score, Recap

Game information
First quarter
- UNM – NaQuari Rodgers 3-yard run (Luke Drzewiecki kick), 9:42. Lobos 7–0. Drive: 9 plays, 64 yards, 3:48.
- NMSU – Larenzo McMillan 84-yard run (Abraham Montano kick), 9:25. Tied 7–7. Drive: 1 play, 84 yards, 0:14.

Second quarter

- UNM – Devon Dampier 11-yard run (Luke Drzewiecki kick), 6:44. Lobos 14–7. Drive: 6 plays, 95 yards, 3:07.
- UNM – Devon Dampier 2-yard run (Luke Drzewiecki kick), 0:22. Lobos 21–7. Drive: 11 plays, 67 yards, 4:42.
- NMSU – Abraham Montano 47-yard field goal, 0:00. Lobos 21–10. Drive: 3 plays, 35 yards, 0:19.

Third quarter

- UNM – Devon Dampier 24-yard run (pass failed), 11:53. Lobos 27–10. Drive: 9 plays, 60 yards, 3:01.
- NMSU – Mike Washington 25-yard pass from Santino Marucci (Abraham Montano kick), 7:06. Lobos 27–17. Drive: 10 plays, 60 yards, 4:47.
- UNM – Luke Drzewiecki 20-yard field goal, 1:27. Lobos 30–17. Drive: 11 plays, 72 yards, 5:39.

Fourth quarter

- NMSU – Abraham Montano 30-yard field goal, 14:53. Lobos 30–20. Drive: 5 plays, 63 yards, 1:34.
- UNM – NaQuari Rodgers 4-yard run (kick failed), 12:13. Lobos 36–20. Drive: 5 plays, 75 yards, 2:40.
- NMSU – Mike Washington 10-yard run (pass failed), 6:09. Lobos 36–26. Drive: 4 plays, 51 yards, 2:12.
- UNM – Javen Jacobs 50-yard run (Luke Drzewiecki kick), 5:14. Lobos 43–26. Drive: 3 plays, 51 yards, 0:54.
- NMSU – Santino Marucci 16-yard run (Abraham Montano kick), 2:34. Lobos 43–33. Drive: 9 plays, 76 yards, 2:33.
- UNM – NaQuari Rodgers 29-yard run (Luke Drzewiecki kick), 1:46. Lobos 50–33. Drive: 3 plays, 46 yards, 0:47.
- NMSU – Mike Washington 2-yard run (Abraham Montano kick), 0:52. Lobos 50–40. Drive: 5 plays, 49 yards, 0:46.

Statistics	UNM	NMSU
First downs	28	27
Total yards	579	474
Rushing yards	331	285
Passing yards	248	189
Turnovers	0	0
Time of possession	33:36	26:24

Team	Category	Player	Statistics
New Mexico	Passing	Devon Dampier	13/28, 248 yards
New Mexico	Rushing	NaQuari Rogers	21 rushes, 122 yards, 3 TD
New Mexico	Receiving	Caleb Medford	2 receptions, 91 yards
New Mexico State	Passing	Santino Marucci	13/29, 189 yards, TD
New Mexico State	Rushing	Larenzo McMillan	1 rush, 84 yards, TD
New Mexico State	Receiving	T. J. Pride	3 receptions, 63 yards

=== at Jacksonville State ===
New Mexico State Aggies at Jacksonville State Gamecocks – Game summary

Quarter	1	2	3	4	Total
Aggies	3	3	0	7	13
Gamecocks	7	26	14	7	54

at AmFirst Stadium, Jacksonville, Alabama

- Date: October 9
- Game time: 5:30 p.m. MDT/6:30 p.m. CDT
- Game weather: Clear, 75 °F (24 °C)
- Game attendance: 16,555
- Referee: Ron Hudson
- TV announcers (ESPN2): Clay Matvick and Steve Addazio
- Box score, Recap

Game information
First quarter
- NMSU – Abraham Montano 53-yard field goal, 8:16. Aggies 3–0. Drive: 7 plays, 41 yards, 3:01.
- JSU – Tre Stewart 10-yard run (Garrison Rippa kick), 6:37. Gamecocks 7–3. Drive: 5 plays, 75 yards, 1:39.

Second quarter

- JSU – Juwaun Campbell 0-yard safety, 14:51. Gamecocks 9–3.
- JSU – Tre Stewart 32-yard pass from Tyler Huff (Garrison Rippa kick), 12:10. Gamecocks 16–3. Drive: 7 plays, 55 yards, 2:32.
- NMSU – Abraham Montano 41-yard field goal, 5:20. Aggies 16–6. Drive: 7 plays, 43 yards, 3:08.
- JSU – Garrison Rippa 45-yard field goal, 2:51. Gamecocks 19–6. Drive: 7 plays, 48 yards, 2:29.
- JSU – Tre Stewart 48-yard run (Garrison Rippa kick), 1:09. Gamecocks 26–6. Drive: 3 plays, 82 yards, 0:26.
- JSU – Tyler Huff 2-yard run (Garrison Rippa kick), 0:20. Gamecocks 33–6. Drive: 3 plays, 20 yards, 0:34.

Third quarter

- JSU – Andrew Paul 28-yard run (Garrison Rippa kick), 9:42. Gamecocks 40–6. Drive: 5 plays, 73 yards, 2:32.
- JSU – Brock Rechsteiner 5-yard pass from Tyler Huff (Garrison Rippa kick), 3:45. Gamecocks 47–6. Drive: 7 plays, 33 yards, 4:03.

Fourth quarter

- JSU – Logan Smothers 72-yard run (Garrison Rippa kick), 14:46. Gamecocks 54–6. Drive: 2 plays, 76 yards, 0:52.
- NMSU – PJ Johnson III 21-yard pass from Parker Awad (Abraham Montano kick), 10:37. Gamecocks 54–13. Drive: 8 plays, 75 yards, 4:09.

Statistics	NMSU	JVST
First downs	22	28
Total yards	350	530
Rushing yards	206	334
Passing yards	144	196
Turnovers	2	0
Time of possession	30:04	29:56

Team	Category	Player	Statistics
New Mexico State	Passing	Parker Awad	9/16, 120 yards, TD, INT
New Mexico State	Rushing	Mike Washington	13 carries, 76 yards
New Mexico State	Receiving	PJ Johnson III	3 receptions, 84 yards, TD
Jacksonville State	Passing	Tyler Huff	11/18, 196 yards, 2 TD
Jacksonville State	Rushing	Tre Stewart	21 carries, 118 yards, 2 TD
Jacksonville State	Receiving	Michael Pettway	1 reception, 54 yards

=== Louisiana Tech ===
Louisiana Tech Bulldogs at New Mexico State Aggies – Game summary

Quarter	1	2	3	4	OT	2OT	Total
Bulldogs	0	14	0	10	3	3	30
Aggies	0	10	7	7	3	6	33

at Aggie Memorial Stadium, Las Cruces, New Mexico

- Date: October 15
- Game time: 7:00 p.m. MDT
- Game weather: Sunny, 80 °F (27 °C)
- Game attendance: 9,671
- Referee: Douglas Mercer
- TV announcers (ESPNU): Mike Corey and Forrest Conoly
- Box score, Recap

Game information

First quarter

No scoring plays

Second quarter

- (11:44) NMSU – TJ Pride 53-yard pass from Parker Awad, Abraham Montano kick (Drive: 3 plays, 56 yards, 1:20; New Mexico State 7–0)
- (4:59) LT – Tru Edwards 7-yard pass from Evan Bullock, Buck Buchanan kick (Drive: 15 plays, 75 yards, 6:45; Tied 7–7)
- (1:12) LT – Omiri Wiggins 1-yard run, Buck Buchanan kick (Drive: 7 plays, 55 yards, 2:20; Louisiana Tech 14–7)
- (0:04) NMSU – Abraham Montano 48-yard field goal (Drive: 7 plays, 39 yards, 1:08; Louisiana Tech 14–10)

Third quarter

- (8:26) NMSU – Brandon Nunez 7-yard run, Abraham Montano kick (Drive: 11 plays, 88 yards, 5:50; New Mexico State 17–14)

Fourth quarter

- (12:11) LT – Buck Buchanan 41-yard field goal (Drive: 14 plays, 46 yards, 6:29; Tied 17–17)
- (4:54) LT – Tru Edwards 15-yard pass from Evan Bullock, Buck Buchanan kick (Drive: 10 plays, 80 yards, 5:47; Louisiana Tech 24–17)
- (1:41) NMSU – Brandon Nunez 4-yard run, Abraham Montano kick (Drive: 11 plays, 75 yards, 3:13; Tied 24–24)

Overtime

- (0:00) NMSU – Abraham Montano 38-yard field goal (Drive: 4 plays, 5 yards, 0:00; New Mexico State 27–24)
- (0:00) LT – Buck Buchanan 37-yard field goal (Drive: 4 plays, 6 yards, 0:00; Tied 27–27)

Second overtime

- (0:00) LT – Buck Buchanan 36-yard field goal (Drive: 4 plays, 7 yards, 0:00; Louisiana Tech 30–27)
- (0:00) NMSU – Mike Washington 4-yard run (Drive: 4 plays, 25 yards, 0:00; New Mexico State 33–30)

Statistics	LT	NMSU
First downs	20	21
Total yards	360	364
Rushing yards	127	160
Passing yards	233	204
Turnovers	0	2
Time of possession	37:11	22:49

Team	Category	Player	Statistics
Louisiana Tech	Passing	Evan Bullock	22/41, 233 yards, 2 TD
Louisiana Tech	Rushing	Omiri Wiggins	14 carries, 63 yards, TD
Louisiana Tech	Receiving	Tru Edwards	9 receptions, 110 yards, TD
New Mexico State	Passing	Parker Awad	11/22, 155 yards, TD
New Mexico State	Rushing	Seth McGowan	17 carries, 66 yards
New Mexico State	Receiving	T. J. Pride	4 receptions, 69 yards, TD

=== at FIU ===
New Mexico State Aggies at FIU Panthers – Game summary

Quarter	1	2	3	4	Total
Aggies	0	6	0	7	13
Panthers	0	7	13	14	34

at Pitbull Stadium, Miami, Florida

- Date: October 29
- Game time: 5:00 p.m. MDT/7:00 p.m. EDT
- Game weather: Cloudy, 81 °F (27 °C)
- Game attendance: 9,103
- Referee: Douglas Mercer
- TV announcers (CBSSN): Dave Ryan and Donte Whitner
- Box score, Recap

Game information
First quarter
- No scoring plays

Second quarter

- NMSU – Abraham Montano 57-yard field goal, 13:30. Aggies 3–0. Drive: 7 plays, 40 yards, 3:55.
- FIU – Eric Rivers 52-yard pass from Keyone Jenkins (Alejandro Prado kick), 13:00. Panthers 7–3. Drive: 2 plays, 73 yards, 0:23.
- NMSU – Abraham Montano 54-yard field goal, 0:10. Panthers 7–6. Drive: 4 plays, 5 yards, 0:37.

Third quarter

- FIU – Alejandro Prado 24-yard field goal, 10:16. Panthers 10–6. Drive: 10 plays, 69 yards, 4:44.
- FIU – Eric Rivers 51-yard pass from Keyone Jenkins (Alejandro Prado kick), 7:49. Panthers 17–6. Drive: 3 plays, 64 yards, 0:56.
- FIU – Alejandro Prado 38-yard field goal, 5:32. Panthers 20–6. Drive: 4 plays, 3 yards, 1:23.

Fourth quarter

- NMSU – Mike Washington 27-yard run (Abraham Montano kick), 14:14. Panthers 20–13. Drive: 3 plays, 43 yards, 0:58.
- FIU – Dean Patterson 2-yard pass from Keyone Jenkins (Alejandro Prado kick), 7:45. Panthers 27–13. Drive: 14 plays, 75 yards, 6:29.
- FIU – Eric Rivers 62-yard pass from Keyone Jenkins (Alejandro Prado kick), 3:49. Panthers 34–13. Drive: 5 plays, 84 yards, 2:33.

Statistics	NMSU	FIU
First downs	15	18
Total yards	246	438
Rushing yards	216	100
Passing yards	30	338
Turnovers	2	0
Time of possession	31:02	28:58

Team	Category	Player	Statistics
New Mexico State	Passing	Santino Marucci	2/4, 18 yards, INT
New Mexico State	Rushing	Mike Washington	11 rushes, 88 yards, TD
New Mexico State	Receiving	P. J. Johnson III	2 receptions, 14 yards
FIU	Passing	Keyone Jenkins	18/27, 338 yards, 4 TD
FIU	Rushing	Kejon Owens	13 rushes, 39 yards
FIU	Receiving	Eric Rivers	11 receptions, 295 yards, 3 TD

=== Western Kentucky ===
Western Kentucky Hilltoppers at New Mexico State Aggies – Game summary

Quarter	1	2	3	4	Total
Hilltoppers	14	10	7	10	41
Aggies	7	0	14	7	28

at Aggie Memorial Stadium, Las Cruces, New Mexico

- Date: November 9
- Game time: 3:00 p.m. MST
- Game weather: Sunny • Temperature: 64 °F (18 °C) • Wind: W 4 miles per hour (6.4 km/h)
- Game attendance: 12,710
- Referee: Rodney Burnette
- TV announcers (ESPN+): Adam Young and Danny Knee
- Box score, Recap

Game information

First quarter

- (13:07) WKU – Easton Messer 54-yard pass from Caden Veltkamp, Lucas Carneiro kick (Drive: 4 plays, 70 yards, 1:49; Western Kentucky 7–0)
- (9:59) WKU – Caden Veltkamp 1-yard run, Lucas Carneiro kick (Drive: 6 plays, 28 yards, 2:57; Western Kentucky 14–0)
- (3:01) NMSU – Mike Washington 1-yard run, Abraham Montaño kick (Drive: 13 plays, 70 yards, 6:52; Western Kentucky 14–7)

Second quarter

- (14:52) WKU – Kisean Johnson 51-yard pass from Dalvin Smith, Lucas Carneiro kick (Drive: 7 plays, 79 yards, 3:03; Western Kentucky 21–7)
- (0:00) WKU – Lucas Carneiro 42-yard field goal (Drive: 9 plays, 59 yards, 5:53; Western Kentucky 24–7)

Third quarter

- (9:14) NMSU – Mike Washington 3-yard run, Abraham Montaño kick (Drive: 5 plays, 36 yards, 2:38; Western Kentucky 24–14)
- (5:28) NMSU – Seth McGowan 7-yard run, Abraham Montaño kick (Drive: 6 plays, 92 yards, 2:24; Western Kentucky 24–21)
- (0:59) WKU – Caden Veltkamp 3-yard run, Lucas Carneiro kick (Drive: 9 plays, 75 yards, 4:29; Western Kentucky 31–21)

Fourth quarter

- (9:58) WKU – K. D. Hutchinson 28-yard pass from Caden Veltkamp, Lucas Carneiro kick (Drive: 6 plays, 51 yards, 2:47; Western Kentucky 38–21)
- (5:03) WKU – Lucas Carneiro 53-yard field goal (Drive: 4 plays, 1 yard, 2:21; Western Kentucky 41–21)
- (1:55) NMSU – Donovan Faupel 29-yard pass from Santino Marucci, Abraham Montaño kick (Drive: 10 plays, 75 yards, 3:08; Western Kentucky 41–28)

Statistics	WKU	NMSU
First downs	17	14
Total yards	413	460
Rushing yards	116	331
Passing yards	297	129
Turnovers	2	5
Time of possession	30:30	29:30

Team	Category	Player	Statistics
Western Kentucky	Passing	Caden Veltkamp	18/27, 246 yards, 2 TD, 2 INT
Western Kentucky	Rushing	Elijah Young	16 carries, 74 yards
Western Kentucky	Receiving	Kisean Johnson	5 receptions, 88 yards, TD
New Mexico State	Passing	Santino Marucci	10/20, 129 yards, TD, 2 INT
New Mexico State	Rushing	Mike Washington	19 carries, 152 yards, 2 TD
New Mexico State	Receiving	Seth McGowan	3 receptions, 47 yards

=== at No. 15 Texas A&M ===
New Mexico State Aggies at No. 15 Texas A&M Aggies – Game summary

Quarter	1	2	3	4	Total
New Mexico State	0	0	0	3	3
No. 15 Texas A&M	17	7	7	7	38

at Kyle Field, College Station, Texas

- Date: November 16
- Game time: 5:45 p.m. MST/6:45 p.m. CST
- Game weather: Cloudy • Temperature: 74 °F (23 °C) • Wind: SE 10 miles per hour (16 km/h)
- Game attendance: 105,815
- Referee: Matt Loeffler
- TV announcers (SECN): Dave Neal, Aaron Murray and Ashley ShahAhmadi
- Box score, Recap

Game information

First quarter

- (11:38) TAMU – Noah Thomas 16-yard pass from Marcel Reed, Randy Bond kick (Drive: 8 plays, 75 yards, 3:22; Texas A&M 7–0)
- (9:43) TAMU – Amari Daniels 71-yard run, Randy Bond kick (Drive: 1 play, 71 yards, 0:14; Texas A&M 14–0)
- (4:26) TAMU – Randy Bond 37-yard field goal (Drive: 9 plays, 56 yards, 4:03; Texas A&M 17–0)

Second quarter

- (13:45) TAMU – Moose Muhammad III 6-yard pass from Marcel Reed, Randy Bond kick (Drive: 9 plays, 95 yards, 4:08; Texas A&M 24–0)

Third quarter

- (6:36) TAMU – Marcel Reed 5-yard run, Randy Bond kick (Drive: 14 plays, 76 yards, 6:38; Texas A&M 31–0)

Fourth quarter

- (13:34) NMSU – Abraham Montaño 48-yard field goal (Drive: 8 plays, 24 yards, 3:13; Texas A&M 31–3)
- (0:42) TAMU – Ashton Bethel-Roman 5-yard pass from Miles O'Neil, Drake Bhatia kick (Drive: 10 plays, 53 yards, 4:52; Texas A&M 38–3)

Statistics	NMSU	TAMU
First downs	12	28
Total yards	214	565
Rushing yards	122	209
Passing yards	92	356
Turnovers	0	2
Time of possession	25:25	34:35

Team	Category	Player	Statistics
New Mexico State	Passing	Santino Marucci	6/19, 80 yards
New Mexico State	Rushing	Seth McGowan	14 carries, 75 yards
New Mexico State	Receiving	Mike Washington	2 receptions, 24 yards
Texas A&M	Passing	Marcel Reed	20/31, 268 yards, 2 TD, INT
Texas A&M	Rushing	Amari Daniels	5 carries, 84 yards, TD
Texas A&M	Receiving	Theo Melin Öhrström	5 receptions, 111 yards

=== at Middle Tennessee ===
New Mexico State Aggies at Middle Tennessee Blue Raiders – Game summary

Quarter	1	2	3	4	Total
Aggies	10	3	13	10	36
Blue Raiders	0	7	7	7	21

at Johnny "Red" Floyd Stadium, Murfreesboro, Tennessee

- Date: November 23
- Game time: 12:30 p.m. MST/1:30 p.m. CST
- Game weather: Sunny, 57 °F (14 °C)
- Game attendance: 10,123
- Referee: Douglas Mercer
- TV announcers (ESPN+): Jake Rose, Jeremy Kellem and Justin Beasley
- Box score, Recap

Game information
First quarter
- NMSU – Dylan Early 30-yard interception return (Abraham Montano kick), 12:46. Aggies 7–0.
- NMSU – Abraham Montano 42-yard field goal, 2:22. Aggies 10–0. Drive: 15 plays, 50 yards, 7:25.

Second quarter

- MTSU – Jaiden Credle 3-yard run (Zeke Rankin kick), 10:56. Aggies 10–7. Drive: 12 plays, 75 yards, 6:25.
- NMSU – Abraham Montano 26-yard field goal, 1:35. Aggies 13–7. Drive: 6 plays, 55 yards, 1:03.

Third quarter

- NMSU – Seth McGowan 12-yard pass from Brandon Nunez (Abraham Montano kick), 9:55. Aggies 20–7. Drive: 3 plays, 49 yards, 1:20.
- MTSU – Holden Willis 12-yard pass from Nicholas Vattiato (Zeke Rankin kick), 3:56. Aggies 20–14. Drive: 11 plays, 78 yards, 5:53.
- NMSU – Mike Washington 11-yard run (run failed), 1:22. Aggies 26–14. Drive: 5 plays, 75 yards, 2:34.

Fourth quarter

- MTSU – Omari Kelly 19-yard pass from Nicholas Vattiato (Zeke Rankin kick), 12:41. Aggies 26–21. Drive: 8 plays, 75 yards, 3:41.
- NMSU – Cooper Sheehan 4-yard pass from Brandon Nunez (Abraham Montano kick), 7:43. Aggies 33–21. Drive: 9 plays, 75 yards, 4:58.
- NMSU – Abraham Montano 21-yard field goal, 1:55. Aggies 36–21. Drive: 9 plays, 58 yards, 4:00.

Statistics	NMSU	MTSU
First downs	18	25
Total yards	382	447
Rushing yards	145	170
Passing yards	237	277
Turnovers	0	2
Time of possession	27:16	32:44

Team	Category	Player	Statistics
New Mexico State	Passing	Parker Awad	12/16, 221 yards
New Mexico State	Rushing	Seth McGowan	12 rushes, 83 yards
New Mexico State	Receiving	Seth McGowan	6 receptions, 96 yards, TD
Middle Tennessee	Passing	Nicholas Vattiato	30/45, 277 yards, 2 TD, 2 INT
Middle Tennessee	Rushing	Jekail Middlebrook	10 rushes, 80 yards
Middle Tennessee	Receiving	Holden Willis	3 receptions, 67 yards, TD

=== UTEP ===
UTEP Miners at New Mexico State Aggies – Game summary

Quarter	1	2	3	4	Total
Miners	7	7	14	14	42
Aggies	17	7	0	11	35

at Aggie Memorial Stadium, Las Cruces, New Mexico

- Date: November 30
- Game time: 2:00 p.m. MST
- Game weather: Sunny, 64 °F (18 °C)
- Game attendance: 15,358
- Referee: Garrett Dickerson
- TV announcers (ESPN+): Adam Young (play-by-play) and Danny Knee (analyst)
- Box score, Recap

Game information
First quarter
- UTEP – Bryton Thompson 33-yard fumble return (Buzz Flabiano kick), 11:45. Miners 7–0.
- NMSU – Abraham Montano 59-yard field goal, 8:09. Miners 7–3. Drive: 9 plays, 33 yards, 3:36.
- NMSU – Seth McGowan 21-yard pass from Parker Awad (Abraham Montano kick), 6:02. Aggies 10–7. Drive: 2 plays, 75 yards, 0:39.
- NMSU – Mike Washington 9-yard run (Abraham Montano kick), 0:57. Aggies 17–7. Drive: 7 plays, 62 yards, 2:34.

Second quarter

- NMSU – T. J. Pride 35-yard pass from Parker Awad (Abraham Montano kick), 12:36. Aggies 24–7. Drive: 4 plays, 46 yards, 1:34.
- UTEP – Jevon Jackson 2-yard run (Buzz Flabiano kick), 10:13. Aggies 24–14. Drive: 8 plays, 75 yards, 2:23.

Third quarter

- UTEP – Jevon Jackson 3-yard run (Buzz Flabiano kick), 10:41. Aggies 24–21. Drive: 4 plays, 72 yards, 0:55.
- UTEP – Kenny Odom 30-yard pass from Skyler Locklear (Buzz Flabiano kick), 5:45. Miners 28–24. Drive: 5 plays, 66 yards, 1:56.

Fourth quarter

- UTEP – Kam Thomas 93-yard punt return (Buzz Flabiano kick), 13:23. Miners 35–24.
- UTEP – Bryton Thompson 5-yard fumble return (Buzz Flabiano kick), 13:12. Miners 42–24.
- NMSU – P. J. Johnson III 30-yard pass from Parker Awad (Mike Washington run), 7:22. Miners 42–32. Drive: 3 plays, 59 yards, 0:52.
- UTEP – Abraham Montano 23-yard field goal, 0:24. Miners 42–35. Drive: 20 plays, 93 yards, 4:09.

Statistics	UTEP	NMSU
First downs	14	33
Total yards	298	543
Rushing yards	121	203
Passing yards	177	340
Turnovers	1	3
Time of possession	20:28	39:32

Team	Category	Player	Statistics
UTEP	Passing	Skyler Locklear	12/26, 177 yards, TD
UTEP	Rushing	Jevon Jackson	18 rushes, 79 yards, 2 TD
UTEP	Receiving	Kam Thomas	4 receptions, 90 yards
New Mexico State	Passing	Parker Awad	22/51, 340 yards, 3 TD, INT
New Mexico State	Rushing	Mike Washington	26 rushes, 130 yards, TD
New Mexico State	Receiving	P. J. Johnson III	3 receptions, 90 yards, TD
