= Tru Edwards =

American football player (born 2001)

Columbus Aviators
- Position: Wide receiver
- Roster status: Active

Personal information
- Born: June 9, 2001 (age 25); Shreveport, Louisiana, U.S.
- Listed height: 6 ft 3 in (1.91 m)
- Listed weight: 211 lb (96 kg)

Career information
- High school: Mansfield Legacy (Mansfield, Texas)
- College: Navarro (2019–2020); Hawaii (2021); Louisiana Tech (2022–2024)
- NFL draft: 2025: undrafted

Career history
- Los Angeles Rams (2025); Columbus Aviators (2027–present)

Awards and highlights
- First-team All-CUSA (2024)
- Stats at Pro Football Reference

Tru Edwards (born June 9, 2001) is an American professional football wide receiver for the Columbus Aviators of United Football League (UFL). He played college football for the Navarro Bulldogs, Hawaii Rainbow Warriors and the Louisiana Tech Bulldogs.

== College career ==
Edwards played college football for the Navarro Bulldogs from 2019 to 2020, Hawaii Rainbow Warriors in 2021 and the Louisiana Tech Bulldogs from 2022 to 2024. He started his college career at Navarro College, where he played for two years, catching 54 passes for 791 yards and six touchdowns.

Edwards then played one season at Hawaii, as a receiver and special teamer, recording five catches for 37 yards. He entered the transfer portal after the 2021 season and committed to Louisiana Tech. After Edwards redshirted his first season, he played in 11 games in 2023, recording 23 receptions for 284 yards and two touchdowns, with his first against UTEP. In 2024, he led the Bulldogs in receptions (84), receiving yards (986) and touchdowns (6), earning him first-team All-CUSA honors.

Edwards entered the transfer portal again and on January 13, 2025, committed to Kentucky. However, he did not sign a National Letter of Intent, encountering eligibility issues with the NCAA.

=== College statistics ===
| Year | Team | Games | | Receiving | | | | Rushing | | | |
| Year | Team | GP | GS | Rec | Yds | Avg | TD | Att | Yds | Avg | TD |
|---|---|---|---|---|---|---|---|---|---|---|---|
| 2019 | Navarro | — | — | 15 | 357 | 23.8 | 2 | 0 | 0 | — | 0 |
| 2020–21 | Navarro | — | — | 39 | 434 | 11.1 | 4 | 1 | -8 | -8.0 | 0 |
| 2021 | Hawaii | 10 | 0 | 5 | 37 | 7.4 | 0 | 0 | 0 | — | 0 |
| 2022 | Louisiana Tech | 3 | 0 | 0 | 0 | — | 0 | 0 | 0 | — | 0 |
| 2023 | Louisiana Tech | 11 | 2 | 23 | 284 | 12.3 | 2 | 0 | 0 | — | 0 |
| 2024 | Louisiana Tech | 13 | 12 | 84 | 986 | 11.7 | 6 | 1 | 1 | 1.0 | 0 |
| NJCCA Career | | — | — | 54 | 791 | 14.7 | 6 | 1 | -8 | -8.0 | 0 |
| FBS Career | | 37 | 17 | 112 | 1,307 | 11.7 | 8 | 1 | 1 | 1.0 | 0 |

== Professional career ==
Pre-draft measurables
| Height | Weight | Arm length | Hand span | Wingspan | 40-yard dash | 10-yard split | 20-yard split | 20-yard shuttle | Three-cone drill | Vertical jump | Broad jump | Bench press |
|---|---|---|---|---|---|---|---|---|---|---|---|---|
| 6 ft 1 7/8 in (1.88 m) | 198 lb (90 kg) | 31 1/2 in (0.80 m) | 9 7/8 in (0.25 m) | 6 ft 4 in (1.93 m) | 4.58 s | 1.59 s | 2.70 s | 4.27 s | 7.28 s | 39.5 in (1.00 m) | 10 ft 7 in (3.23 m) | 18 reps |
All values from Pro Day

After not being selected in the 2025 NFL draft, Edwards signed with the Los Angeles Rams as an undrafted free agent. On August 26, 2025, he was waived by the team but was re-signed to the practice squad the following day.

On January 27, 2026, Edwards signed a reserve/futures contract with Los Angeles. On August 29, Edwards was waived by the Rams.

== Personal life ==
Edwards is the son of Troy Edwards, who played in the NFL as a wide receiver for seven seasons and was the 1998 Fred Biletnikoff Award winner.
