= Mike Washington Jr. =

American football player (born 2003)

No. 4 – Las Vegas Raiders
- Position: Running back
- Roster status: Active

Personal information
- Born: July 3, 2003 (age 23); Utica, New York, U.S.
- Listed height: 6 ft 2 in (1.88 m)
- Listed weight: 228 lb (103 kg)

Career information
- High school: Cicero–North (Cicero, New York)
- College: Buffalo (2021–2023); New Mexico State (2024); Arkansas (2025)
- NFL draft: 2026: 4th round, 122nd overall pick

Career history
- Las Vegas Raiders (2026–present)

Awards and highlights
- Second-team All-SEC (2025)

Career NFL statistics as of Week 4, 2026
- Rushing yards: 120
- Rushing average: 5
- Rushing touchdowns: 1
- Stats at Pro Football Reference

Michael Washington Jr. (born July 3, 2003) is an American professional football running back for the Las Vegas Raiders of the National Football League (NFL). He played college football for the Buffalo Bulls, New Mexico State Aggies and the Arkansas Razorbacks. Washington was selected by the Raiders in the fourth round of the 2026 NFL draft.

== Early life ==
Washington Jr. attended Cicero–North Syracuse High School in Cicero, New York where he played running back and defensive end. As a junior, he rushed for 1,423 yards with 15 touchdowns. He committed to the University at Buffalo to play college football.

== College career ==
Washington Jr. played at Buffalo from 2021 to 2023, recording 1,119 yards on 263 carries and 10 touchdowns over 27 games. After the 2023 season, he entered the transfer portal and transferred to New Mexico State University. In his lone season at New Mexico State in 2024, he played in 12 games and rushed 157 times for 725 yards and eight touchdowns. After the season, Washington Jr. entered the portal again and transferred to the University of Arkansas. He spent the 2025 season as the starting running back for Arkansas where he rushed for 1,070 yards and eight touchdowns, and received for 226 yards and a touchdown in 12 games.

=== Statistics ===
Year	Team	GP	Rushing				Receiving			
Year	Team	GP	Att	Yds	Avg	TD	Rec	Yds	Avg	TD
2021	Buffalo	3	23	132	5.7	1	0	0	–	0
2022	Buffalo	13	150	625	4.2	7	23	135	5.9	1
2023	Buffalo	11	90	362	4.0	2	13	35	2.7	0
2024	New Mexico State	12	157	725	4.6	8	9	74	8.2	1
2025	Arkansas	12	167	1,070	6.4	8	28	226	8.1	1
Career		51	587	2,914	5.0	26	73	470	6.4	3

== Professional career ==
Pre-draft measurables
Height	Weight	Arm length	Hand span	Wingspan	40-yard dash	10-yard split	20-yard split	20-yard shuttle	Three-cone drill	Vertical jump	Broad jump	Bench press
6 ft 1 in (1.85 m)	223 lb (101 kg)	33 5/8 in (0.85 m)	9 1/4 in (0.23 m)	6 ft 10 in (2.08 m)	4.33 s	1.51 s	2.52 s	4.32 s	6.96 s	39.0 in (0.99 m)	10 ft 8 in (3.25 m)	17 reps
All values from NFL Combine/Pro Day

Washington was selected by the Las Vegas Raiders in the fourth round with the 122nd overall pick of the 2026 NFL draft.
