= Jimmy Holiday (American football) =

American football player (born 2001)

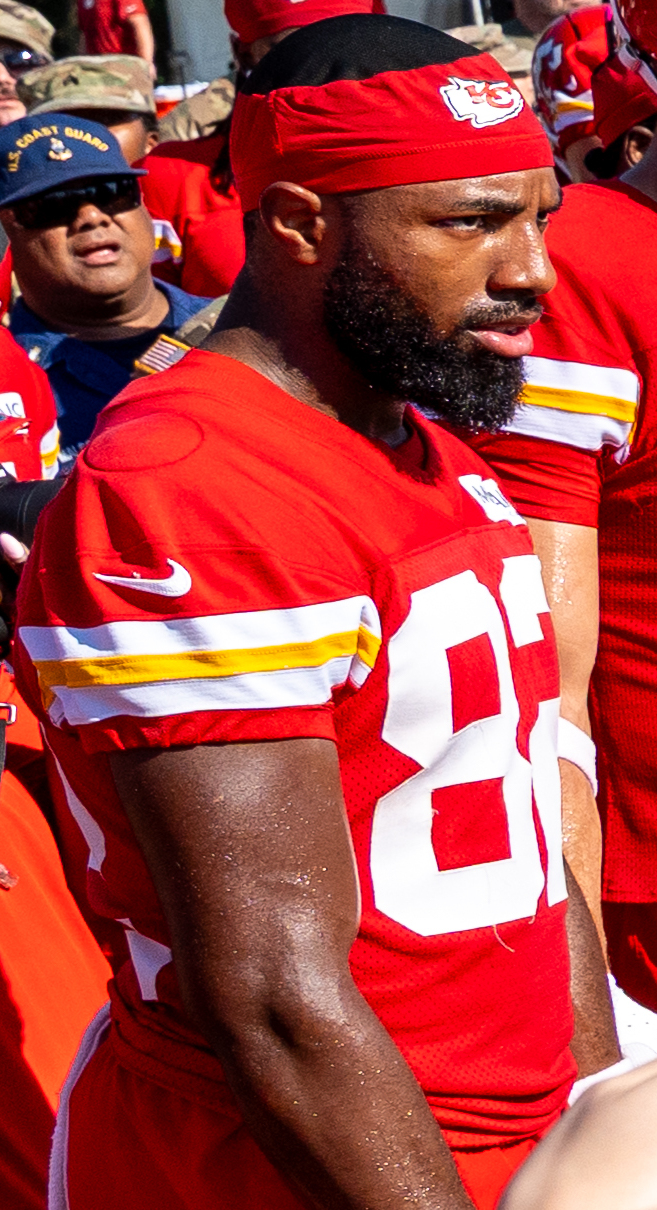
- Holiday with the Kansas City Chiefs in 2025

No. 82 – Kansas City Chiefs
- Position: Wide receiver
- Roster status: Injured reserve

Personal information
- Born: December 16, 2001 (age 24)
- Listed height: 6 ft 1 in (1.85 m)
- Listed weight: 211 lb (96 kg)

Career information
- High school: Madison Central (Madison, Mississippi)
- College: Tennessee (2020–2022); Western Kentucky (2023); Louisiana Tech (2024)
- NFL draft: 2025: undrafted

Career history
- Kansas City Chiefs (2025)*; Seattle Seahawks (2025)*; Kansas City Chiefs (2025–present)
- * Offseason or practice squad member only

Career NFL statistics as of 2025
- Games played: 1
- Stats at Pro Football Reference

Jimmy Jadore Holiday (born December 16, 2001) is an American professional football wide receiver for the Kansas City Chiefs of the National Football League (NFL). He played college football for the Tennessee Volunteers, the Western Kentucky Hilltoppers and the Louisiana Tech Bulldogs.

== Early life ==
Holiday was born in 2001 as one of six children to April and Jimmy Holiday. In high school, he played wide receiver and quarterback with the Madison Central Jaguars. Holiday was named to the 2018 and 2019 Clarion Ledger Second Team All-State selections and won the 2018 Region 2-6A Offensive MVP award. Rated a three-star collegiate recruit, he earned a Gene Felty Men's Athletic Endowed Scholarship and graduated early. Holiday initially committed to Texas Christian University.

== College career ==
=== Tennessee ===
Holiday enrolled at the University of Tennessee. Initially recruited as a quarterback, he joined the Volunteers in the 2020 season as a wide receiver reservist and member of special teams. Holiday played in eight games during his freshman season. He continued in this role during his sophomore season in 2021, playing in 11 games. In his junior season in 2022, Holiday caught his first touchdown pass from Joe Milton during the winning season-opening game against Ball State. In the 2022 season, he had six receptions for 106 yards and one touchdown to go with 14 kickoff returns for 281 yards. While he played for Tennessee, Holiday majored in sport management.

=== Western Kentucky ===
In 2023, Holiday transferred to Western Kentucky University. He started five of 11 games with the Hilltoppers team and finished his only season with 326 yards and two touchdowns on 20 receptions.

=== Louisiana Tech ===
Holiday transferred to Louisiana Tech University. In his first and only season with the Bulldogs in 2024, Holiday started the final six of the total 13 games. His career finished placing second on the team in receptions and receiving yards. He also tied for the team lead in rushing scores and total touchdowns.

== Professional career ==
Pre-draft measurables
Height	Weight	Arm length	Hand span	Wingspan	40-yard dash	10-yard split	20-yard split	20-yard shuttle	Three-cone drill	Vertical jump	Broad jump
5 ft 11 7/8 in (1.83 m)	199 lb (90 kg)	32 7/8 in (0.84 m)	9 1/8 in (0.23 m)	6 ft 3 in (1.91 m)	4.40 s	1.53 s	2.57 s	4.41 s	6.94 s	36.5 in (0.93 m)	10 ft 3 in (3.12 m)
All values from Pro Day

=== Kansas City Chiefs (first stint) ===
On May 6, 2025, Holiday signed with the Kansas City Chiefs as an undrafted free agent following the 2025 NFL draft. He was assigned to the practice squad after the first phase of active roster cuts were announced on August 27. Holliday was released by Kansas City on November 24.

=== Seattle Seahawks ===
On November 26, 2025, Holiday was signed to the Seattle Seahawks' practice squad. He was released by the Seahawks on December 13.

=== Kansas City Chiefs (second stint) ===
On December 17, 2025, Holiday was signed to the Kansas City Chiefs' practice squad. He signed a reserve/future contract with Kansas City on January 5, 2026.

On August 30, 2026, Holiday was placed on season–ending injured reserve.

== Personal life ==
Holiday's five siblings include three brothers named BJ, Jamar and Javeon, and two sisters named Jakayla and Jaylan. His hobbies include fishing, hunting and riding horses. Holiday named professional basketball player LeBron James as the professional athlete he models himself after, citing James' work ethic. He also named professional football players Deebo Samuel, Amon-Ra St. Brown, and Ja'Marr Chase as athletes he patterns his game after. He has publicly shared that he doesn't eat green vegetables despite being a professional athlete. Holiday credits his father as his role model. His favorite NFL team is the New Orleans Saints.
