= Eric Rivers =

American football player (born 2002)

No. 83 – Tampa Bay Buccaneers
- Position: Wide receiver
- Roster status: Practice squad

Personal information
- Born: September 17, 2002 (age 24)
- Listed height: 5 ft 10 in (1.78 m)
- Listed weight: 176 lb (80 kg)

Career information
- High school: McCallie (Chattanooga, Tennessee)
- College: Memphis (2021–2022); FIU (2023–2024); Georgia Tech (2025)
- NFL draft: 2026: undrafted

Career history
- Tampa Bay Buccaneers (2026–present)*
- * Offseason or practice squad member only

Awards and highlights
- First-team All-C-USA (2024)
- Stats at Pro Football Reference

Eric Rivers (born September 17, 2002) is an American professional football wide receiver for the Tampa Bay Buccaneers of the National Football League (NFL). He played college football for the Memphis Tigers, FIU Panthers, and Georgia Tech Yellow Jackets.

== Early life ==
Rivers attended The McCallie School in Chattanooga, Tennessee. As a senior, he recorded 25 receptions for 509 yards and seven touchdowns, in addition to rushing for 231 yards and three touchdowns, before committing to play college football at the University of Memphis.

== College career ==
After playing sparingly as a freshman in 2021 and not playing due to injury in 2022 at Memphis, Rivers entered the transfer portal. Rivers transferred to Florida International University to play for the FIU Panthers. In his first season with FIU, he recorded 32 receptions for 343 yards and two touchdowns, before having a breakout season the following year. In 2024, he set the school record for single game receiving yards, hauling in 295 yards and three touchdowns against New Mexico State.

On December 18, 2024, Rivers announced his decision to transfer to the Georgia Institute of Technology to play for the Georgia Tech Yellow Jackets.

=== College statistics ===
| Season | Team | Games | | Receiving | | | |
| Season | Team | GP | GS | Rec | Yds | Avg | TD |
|---|---|---|---|---|---|---|---|
| 2021 | Memphis | 7 | 0 | 0 | 0 | 0.0 | 0 |
| 2022 | Memphis | 0 | 0 | DNP (injury—shoulder) | | | |
| 2023 | FIU | 11 | 0 | 32 | 370 | 11.6 | 2 |
| 2024 | FIU | 12 | 12 | 62 | 1,172 | 18.9 | 12 |
| 2025 | Georgia Tech | 7 | 7 | 23 | 257 | 11.2 | 1 |
| Career | | 31 | 13 | 97 | 1,566 | 16.1 | 14 |

== Professional career ==
Pre-draft measurables
| Height | Weight | Arm length | Hand span | Wingspan | 40-yard dash | 10-yard split | 20-yard split | Vertical jump | Broad jump |
|---|---|---|---|---|---|---|---|---|---|
| 5 ft 10 1/8 in (1.78 m) | 176 lb (80 kg) | 30 1/2 in (0.77 m) | 9 in (0.23 m) | 6 ft 2 7/8 in (1.90 m) | 4.35 s | 1.52 s | 2.55 s | 37.0 in (0.94 m) | 10 ft 7 in (3.23 m) |
All values from NFL Combine

Rivers signed with the Tampa Bay Buccaneers as an undrafted free agent on May 8, 2026. Rivers was waived by the Buccaneers as a part of final roster cuts on August 30; he was re-signed to the team's practice squad the following day.
