= Alvarez College of Business =

Business school of the University of Texas at San Antonio

Carlos Alvarez College of Business
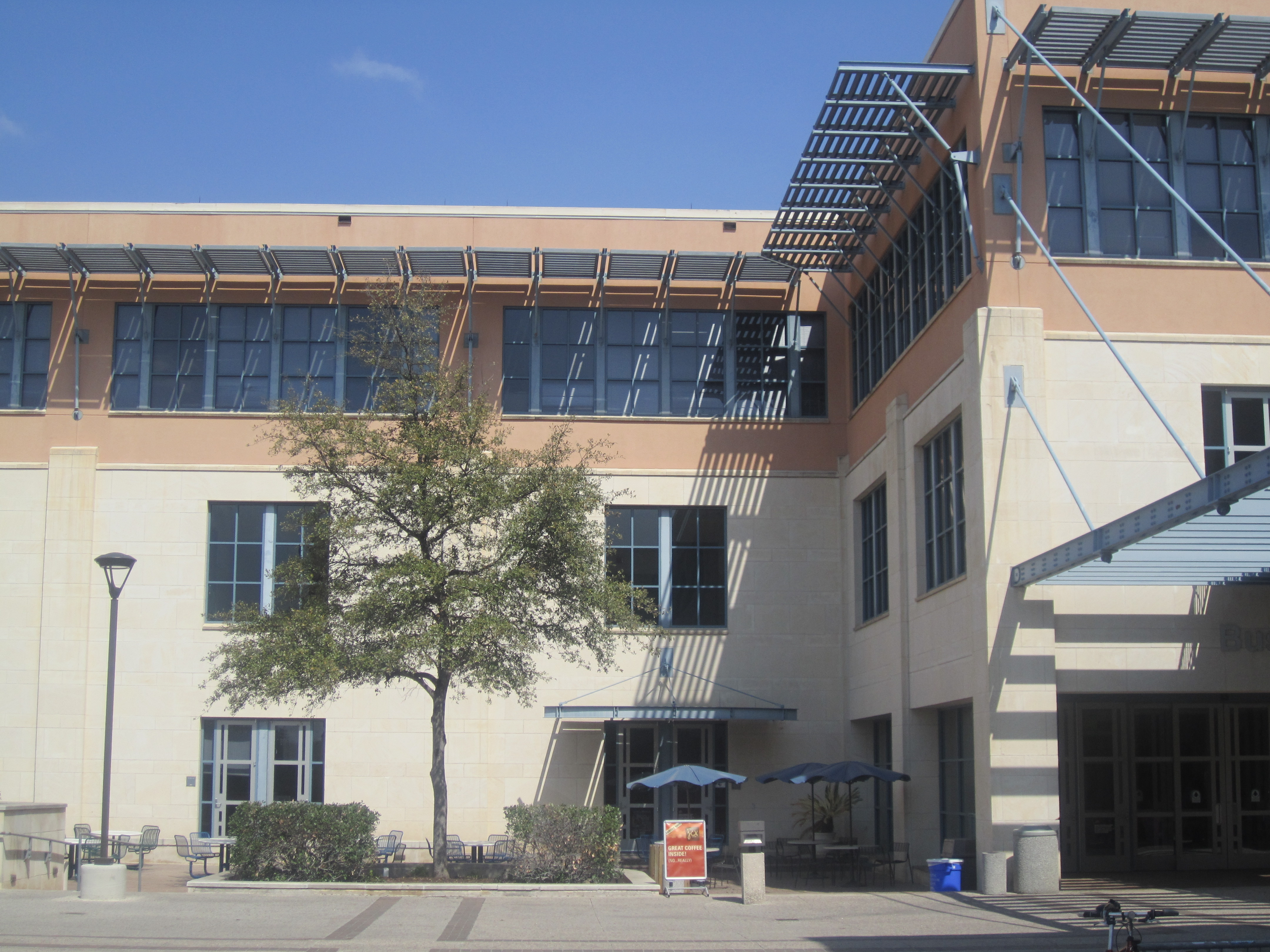
- Former names: College of Business (1969-2020)
- Type: Public Business School
- Established: 1969
- Parent institution: University of Texas at San Antonio
- Dean: Jonathon Halbesleben
- Academic staff: 110 full-time faculty, 103 tenured and tenure-track
- Students: 5,193
- Undergraduates: 4,567
- Postgraduates: 528
- Doctoral students: 98
- Location: San Antonio, Texas, U.S.
- Campus: Urban
- Colours: Blue and Orange
- Website: business.utsa.edu

The Carlos Alvarez College of Business is the largest business school in the University of Texas System and one of the 30 largest in the United States. The Carlos Alvarez College of Business, located at The University of Texas at San Antonio (UTSA), is accredited by AACSB International, the Association to Advance Collegiate Schools of Business. It is nationally ranked by the Princeton Review, BusinessWeek and HispanicBusiness. The college hosts undergraduate, graduate, and doctoral degrees in many different fields of study.

== History ==
UTSA was originally established with 5 colleges, the College of Business being one of them. Shortly after Louis J. Rodriguez, the first Dean of the College of Business, was hired in 1971. Rodriguez would later become the Vice President for Academic Affairs and Dean of Faculties at UTSA making way for E.D. “Doug” Hodo to be appointed as the new Dean in 1972. Hodo served as Dean until 1987. In 1981 Lila Flory-Truett became the first woman to be named Director of the Division of Economics and Finance.

During the month of August in 1991, UTSA became the first university in Texas to receive U.S. Department of Education grant to internationalize College of Business. One year later in July 1992, the Master of Science degree in Management of Technology was approved by Texas Higher Education Coordinating Board, the first of its kind in Texas. The joint program between the College of Business and the College of Sciences and Engineering began in the 1993-94 academic year. In December 1994, the university broke ground on a new building to house the business school.

Four years after becoming the fourth dean Dr. Bruce Bublitz stepped down making way for Dr. Lynda Y. de la Viña to become the first female and Hispanic Dean of the UTSA College of Business.

Wm. Gerard Sanders served as Dean from April 2013 - December 2020. Pamela Smith was named interim Dean effective January 2021 and joined UTSA in 2001.

In 2018 UTSA announced a $90 million expansion of its downtown campus which included an expansion of the business school.

On March 24, 2021 Carlos Alvarez, the CEO of The Gambrinus Company, a leading craft brewer that he founded in San Antonio, Texas, which owns and operates the Spoetzl Brewery and the Trumer Brewery, announced a $20 million gift to the College of Business. In honor of his donation the college was renamed to the Carlos Alvarez College of Business, becoming the first business school in the University of Texas system to be named after a Latino.

Jonathon Halbesleben became dean of the Alvarez College of Business on June 1, 2022, having previously served as the dean of the College of Continuing Studies at the University of Alabama.

== Rankings and accolades ==
- #1 Hispanic serving business school for undergraduates according to Bloomberg Businessweek
- #1 cyber security program in the nation according to the Ponemon Institute
- One of the Top 5 Texas business schools for undergraduates according to Bloomberg Businessweek
- #10 graduate business school in the nation for Hispanics by Hispanic Business
- Top 10 MBA program for minorities by the Princeton Review for the past 10 years
- Received the Brillante Award for Educational Excellence from the National Society for Hispanic MBA's (2013)
- 35th nationally for marketing faculty research publications according to UT Dallas study (2015–2016)
- 64th nationally for accounting faculty research publications according to UT Dallas study (2015–2016)
- 81st nationally for management science faculty research according to UT Dallas study (2015–2016)
- 10th in the South for economics faculty research according to Applied Economics Letters
