= Herman Weiss =

Herman Joseph Weiss
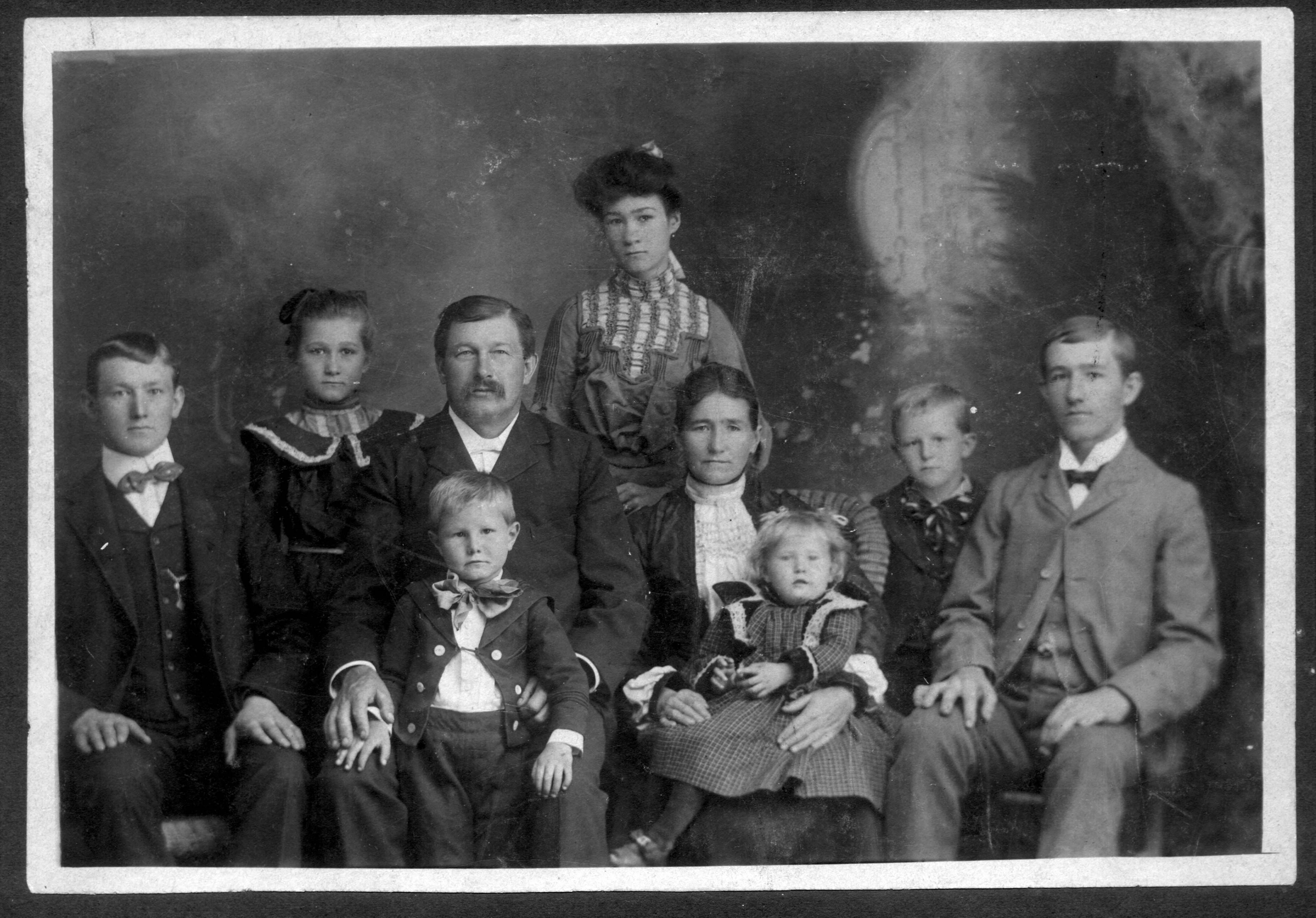
- Herman & Maria Weiss Family circa 1900
- Born: February 19, 1856; Prussia
- Died: March 19, 1926 (aged 70); San Antonio, Texas, U.S.
- Occupation: Brewmaster
- Known for: 1st brewmaster in 1909 at the Shiner Brewery

Herman Joseph Weiss (February 19, 1856 – March 19, 1926) was a Prussian-born American brewmaster. He immigrated to Texas in the 1880s with his wife, Maria.

== Career ==
=== San Antonio Saloon ===
According to the 1900 census, Herman Weiss was living in San Antonio and working as a saloon keeper. A newspaper article in 1895 cites the location as the corner of S. Alamo and Market St.

His eldest son, Herman Weiss Jr, is listed with the family at the age of 18 and is working as a brewer at the Lone Star Brewery.

=== Weiss and Sons ===
From 1907 to 1909, he lived in Galveston where he owned and operated the Herman J. Weiss & Sons Brewery. Both his eldest sons, Herman Weiss Jr. and Charles Weiss, worked at the brewery with their father.

=== Shiner Brewery ===
In the summer of 1909, Herman Weiss Sr. was offered the position of head brewmaster at the newly formed Shiner Brewery which later became the Spoetzl Brewery. According to the 1910 census, Charles Weiss lived in Shiner, Texas and worked at the brewery as well. Photographic evidence suggests that Herman Jr. worked at the Shiner Brewery as well in 1909. Herman Weiss Jr and his family are shown to be residing in Houston in the 1910 census. The Shiner Brewery had early success, but may have suffered refrigeration issues. Newspaper articles from the Shiner Gazette in the summer of 1910 report that a refrigeration system was installed at the brewery. There is no mention of spoilage found in the Shiner Gazette from that period. In October 1910, the Shiner Gazette reported that a new brewmaster, Mr. Hollenburg, had been hired and Herman Weiss Sr. and Charles Weiss had departed with their families for Houston.

=== San Antonio Brewing Association ===
Herman Weiss Sr. was later employed in San Antonio as a brewmaster for the San Antonio Brewing Association which later became the Pearl Brewing Company. He also ran a saloon out of his residence at 400 James St. A 1915 newspaper article states that Hernan was the Vice President of the San Antonio Brewery Workers Union, indicating his standing in the industry.

== Images ==
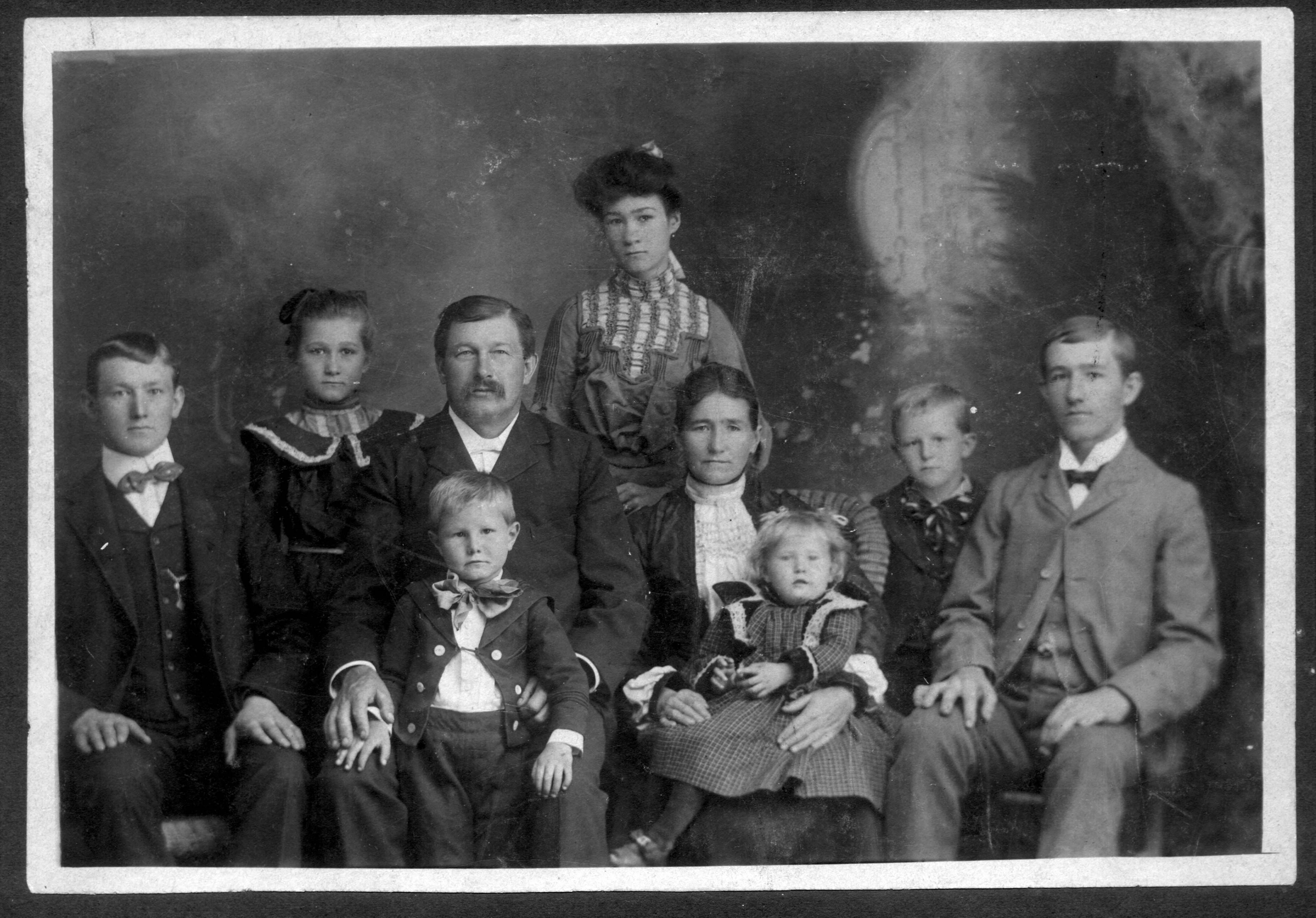
Weiss Family circa 1902

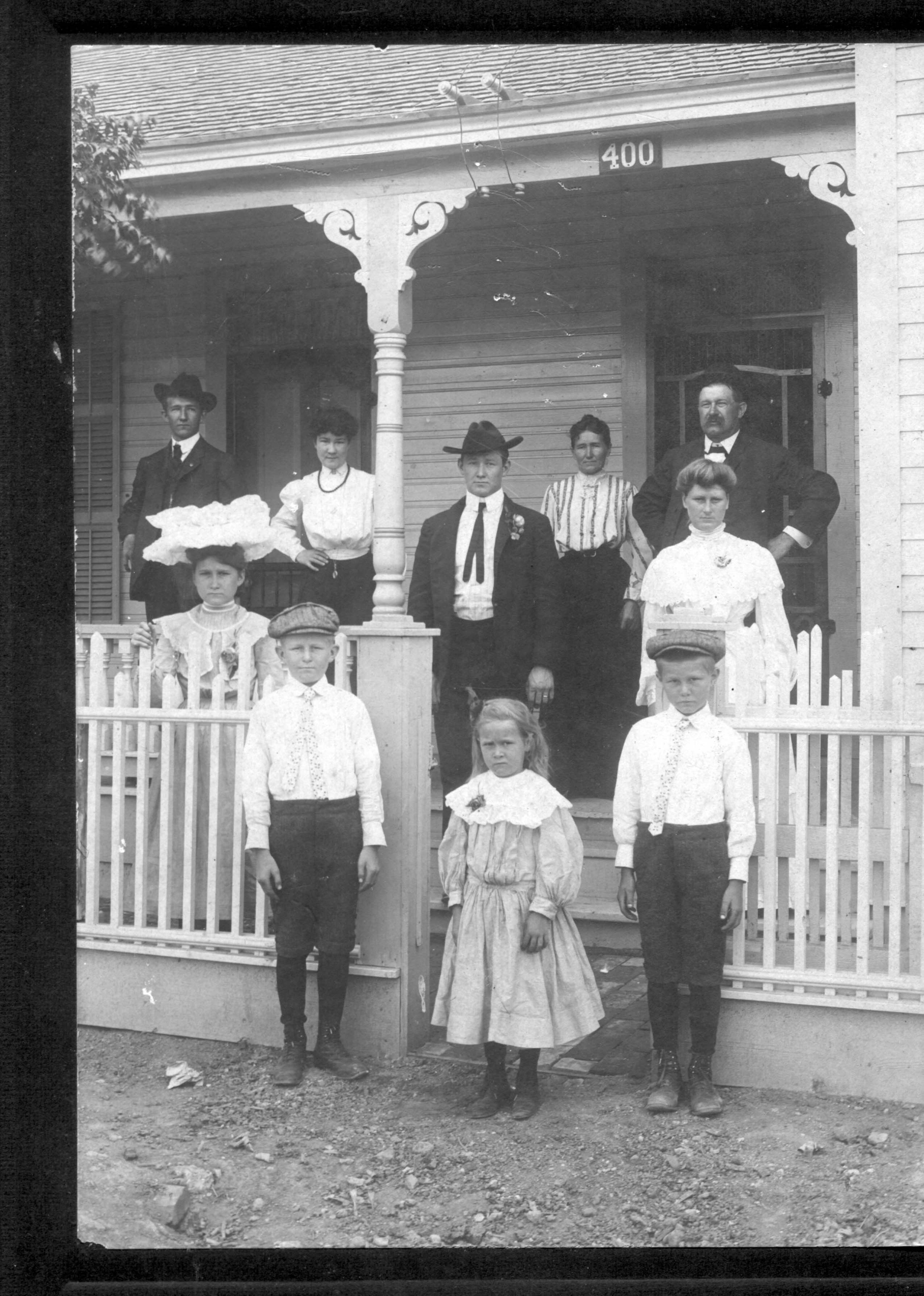
Weiss Family at the family residence in San Antonio, circa 1904

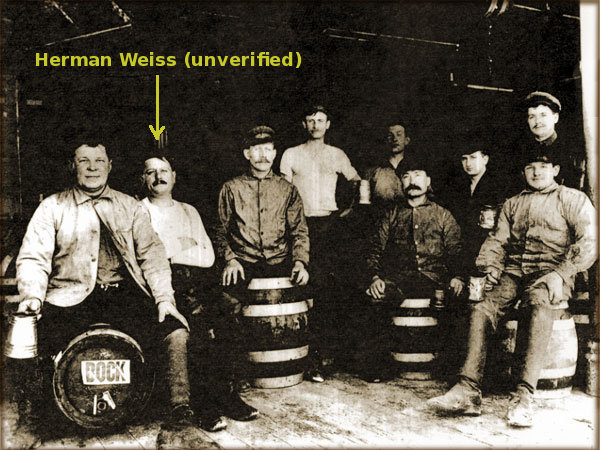
Pearl Brewery crew. circa 1910+

Young Herman Weiss with his tuba.

Weiss Family at the family residence in San Antonio, circa 1904

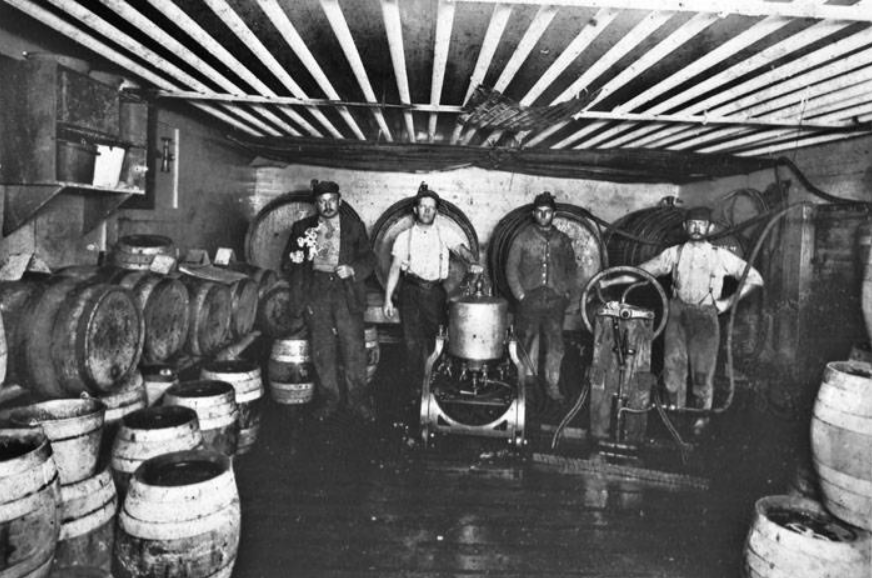
Shiner Brewery Sept 1909. L-R Herman Weiss Sr, Charles Weiss, Herman Weiss Jr, Unknown man. Photo taken by Ben Novak according to the Shiner Gazette Sept 16, 1909.

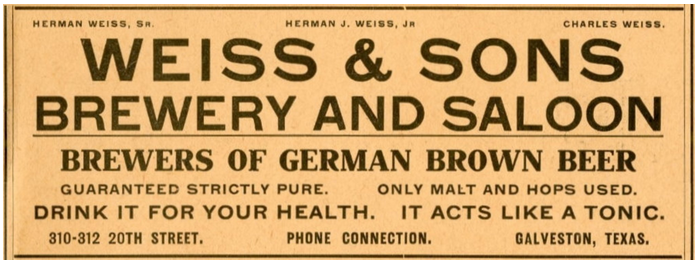
Weiss and Sons Brewery Ad, 1908 Galveston.
