= Ranch hand (disambiguation) =

A ranch hand is a manual laborer on a ranch, such as a cowboy.

Ranch Hand may also refer to:

- Operation Ranch Hand, a US Air Force operation during the Vietnam war
- Ranch Hand Truck Accessories, an American manufacturer of heavy duty truck accessories
- Rossi Ranch Hand, a Mare's Leg-style handgun
