= Texas Precious Metals =

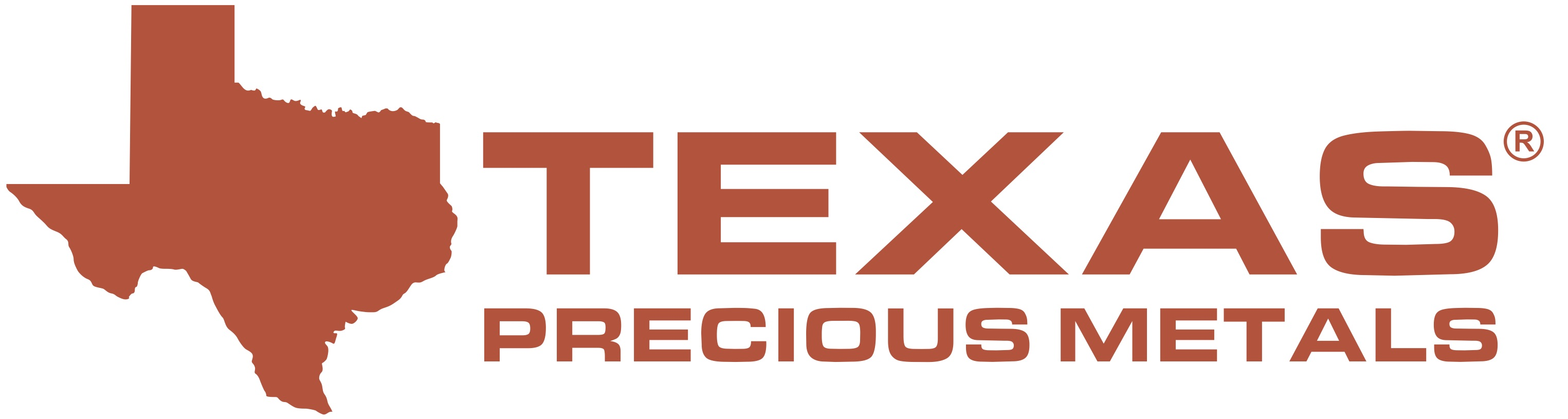
- Type: Private
- Industry: Precious metals
- Founded: 2011
- Headquarters: Shiner, Texas, United States
- Area served: North America
- Key people: Tarek Saab, President & Co-founder Jason Kaspar, Co-founder
- Products: Gold coins and bars Silver coins and bars
- Revenue: 2013: $180.1M; 2014: $153.2M
- Website: www.texmetals.com

Texas Precious Metals, based in Shiner, Texas, is one of the largest precious metals dealers in the United States. The company reported annual revenues of $180.1 million in 2013 and $153.2 million in 2014. The company is recognized as a market maker for United States Mint products and is an official distributor for the Perth Mint of Australia.

== History ==
In 2010, Texas Precious Metals originated as a joint venture project between Saab & Company Inc. and Kaspar Texas Traditions (KTT). The company maintained a business-to-business model serving the wholesale market, selling gold and silver bullion exclusively to coin shops and precious metals retailers.

In 2015, Inc. (magazine) recognized Texas Precious Metals as a member of the Inc. 500. Texas Precious Metals, the largest subsidiary of Kaspar Texas Traditions comprising 99.8% revenue, was ranked the #200 fastest growing private company in America with a 3-year growth rate of 2,095%.

In 2016, Texas Precious Metals responded to Texas HB 483 with a proposed solution for the Texas Bullion Depository but lost its bid to Lone Star Tangible Assets.

== Products ==
The company's signature product is the Texas Silver Round.

== The Perth Mint Partnership ==
In 2014, Texas Precious Metals and the Perth Mint of Australia released the Houston-Perth "Sister Cities" coin, commemorating the strong ties between the cities' energy sectors.

== Corporate identity ==
Texas Precious Metals owns the trademark for industry usage of the image of the state of Texas along with the slogan “Business the Texas Way.”

In 2026, Texas Precious Metals filed a lawsuit against the State of Texas over trademark claims involving the outline of the state used on precious metal products.

== Associations ==
Texas Precious Metals is a member of the Industry Council for Tangible Assets (ICTA) and the American Numismatic Association (ANA).
