= Shiner High School (Texas) =

Location
- 510 County Road 348; Shiner, Texas 77984-0804; United States; 29.446910°N 97.186436°W

Information
- School type: Public High School
- School district: Shiner Independent School District
- Principal: Brian McCraw
- Teaching staff: 26.48 (on an FTE basis)
- Grades: 7-12
- Enrollment: 294 (2023–24)
- Student to teacher ratio: 11.10
- Colors: Purple and gold
- Athletics conference: UIL Class AA
- Mascot: Comanche
- Yearbook: Chieftain
- Website: Shiner High School

Shiner High School is a public high school located in Shiner, Texas, United States and classified as a 2A school by the UIL. It is part of the Shiner Independent School District located in western Lavaca County. In 2015, the school was rated "Met Standard" by the Texas Education Agency.

== Athletics ==
The Shiner Comanches compete in these sports

- Baseball
- Basketball
- Cross country
- Football
- Softball
- Tennis
- Track and field
- Volleyball
- Golf

=== State titles for Shiner High School Athletics ===
- Baseball
  - 1981(2A), 1992(2A), 2002(1A), 2004(1A)
- Football -
  - 1986(2A), 2004(1A), 2020 (2A/D1), 2021 (2A/D1)
- Softball
  - 2001(1A), 2002(1A), 2008(1A), 2011(1A), 2015(2A), 2016(2A), 2024(2A), 2026(2A/D2)
- Track and field
  - 2016 girls (2A), 2021 Boys (2A)
- Mixed Tennis
  - 2007 (1A)

==== State finalists ====
- Girls basketball
  - 1974(1A)
- Football
  - 2003(1A), 2013(1A/D1) 2024(2A/D2), 2025(2A/D2)
- Softball
  - 2007(1A), 2017(2A), 2025(2A/D2)
- Baseball

2022(2A), 2023(2A)

== UIL Lone Star Cup ==
- UIL Lone Star Cup Champions🥇:
  - 2001(1A), 2002(1A), 2015(2A), 2021 (2A), 2023 (2A), 2025 (2A)

UIL Lone Star Cup Runner Ups 🥈 : 2024 (2A) , 2022 (2A) , 2021 (2A) , 2015 (2A)

UIL Lone Star Cup Fourth Place 🏅 : 2016 (2A)

== Band ==
- UIL Marching Band Champions
  - 2013(1A), 2022 (2A)

State Runners Up in band: 2011 (1A), 2021 (2A)

Fourth Place: 2023 (2A)

Fifth Place : 2025 (2A)

Sixth Place : 2026 (2A)

State Advancing / Seventh Place : 2017(2A)

State Appearances in band total 11

State Appearneces at the UIL Conference 2A State Marching Band Contest :2026,2025,2023,2022,2021,2018,2017

State Appearneces at the UIL Conference 1A State Marching Band Contest : 2013,2011,2007,2005

UIL Conference 2A State Band Contest Finals Apearences 2025,2023,2022,2021,2018,2017

UIL Conference 1A State Band Contest Finals Apearences 2013, 2011, 2007

== One Act Play ==
2024 (2A)

== Academics ==
2024 Theater / Theater Design (2A)

== Official football rivalries with other schools ==
Refugio Bobcats (2A)

Ganado Indians (2A)

Falls City Beavers ''(2A)

*Hallettsville Brahmas (3A)

Flatonia Bulldogs (2A)

Schulenburg Shorthorns

Weimar Wildcats (2A)

Danbury Panthers (2A)

Charlotte Hornets (2A)

Pettus War Eagles (2A)

Louise Hornets (2A)

* Please note that in 2026 the Hallettsville ISD and their High School Athletic Department at Hallettsville High School decided to not play Shiner for the first game of the 2026 season and to also discontinue the Shiner vs Hallettsville Football Game for the first game of the season which includes the annual Shiner vs Hallettsville Football Rivalry which was the first official Opening Game, First Game of the Season, and Week One

For Week 1 of the 2026 Football Season the following Happened

Shiner played Industrial (Shiner Won 41-12)

Hallettsville played Schulenburg (Hallettsville Won 49-0)

== School song and other band music ==
The Shiner School song is a excerpt from Our Director March composed and written by F.E Bigelow which is preformed by the Shiner High School Marching Band

The Shiner Song Polka originally by Joe Patek and the Joe Patek Orchestra is preformed by the Shiner High School Marching Band for Shiners Fight Song after First downs , Touchdowns , and Turn overs on down

At Home games at Comanche Stadium in Shiner Texas the Shiner High School Marching Band does the US National Anthem before kickoff

The Tomahawk Chop Song is originally from the Kansas City Chiefs (NFL) , Florida State Seminoles (NCAA College Football) , and Atlanta Braves (MLB) . The one used and performed at Football Games and Pep Rallies by the Shiner High School Marching Band is a slight variation . The Tomahawk Chop Song is for when the Football Team is entering in to the Gym for Pep Rallies on the Football Field close to and at the Beginning of Kick off during Football Games , and during the Football Game .

Shiner pep rally music in order

Tomahawk Chop Song

Shiner School Song (Our Director March)

Shiner Song Polka

(Shiner High School has a Cheerleader Squad Program )

== Notable alumni ==
- Dalton Brooks (Class of 2023), college football safety for the Texas A&M Aggies
- Carroll Sembera (Class of 1959), Major League Baseball relief pitcher for Houston Astros & Montreal Expos
