= Shiner Independent School District =

School district in Texas, United States

Address
- 505 Texas Avenue Shiner, Texas, 77984
- Coordinates: 29.44635°N 97.17746°W

District information
- Motto: Continuing Excellence in Education
- Grades: PK-12
- Superintendent: Lee Moses
- Schools: 2
- NCES District ID: 4840110

Students and staff
- Students: 717
- Teachers: 53.99
- Student–teacher ratio: 13.28:1
- District mascot: Comanches

Other information
- Website: Official website

Shiner Independent School District is a public school district based in Shiner, Texas, USA, and serves students in Lavaca County. A portion of the district extends into Gonzales County.

== Campuses ==
Shiner ISD has a combined high school/elementary campus – Shiner High School (grades 9–12) and Shiner Elementary (prekindergarten–grade 8). Construction of a new campus began in January 2006 and was completed in April 2007. The new campus is located just north of town directly adjacent to Comanche Stadium. Previously, both schools were located on a single city block along Avenue E (Highway 90-A).

== Athletics ==
Shiner ISD has been successful athletically in the past, with its teams winning multiple state championships in football, baseball, and softball. Shiner ISD has also twice been awarded the Lone Star Cup (2000–2001 and 2001–2002), which is awarded based on combined academic and athletic achievement.

== Academics ==
The Texas Education Agency assigned Shiner ISD a "B" grade in 2023.
