= Spoetzl Brewery =

Craft brewery located in Shiner, Texas

Coordinates: 29.433674°N 97.167227°W

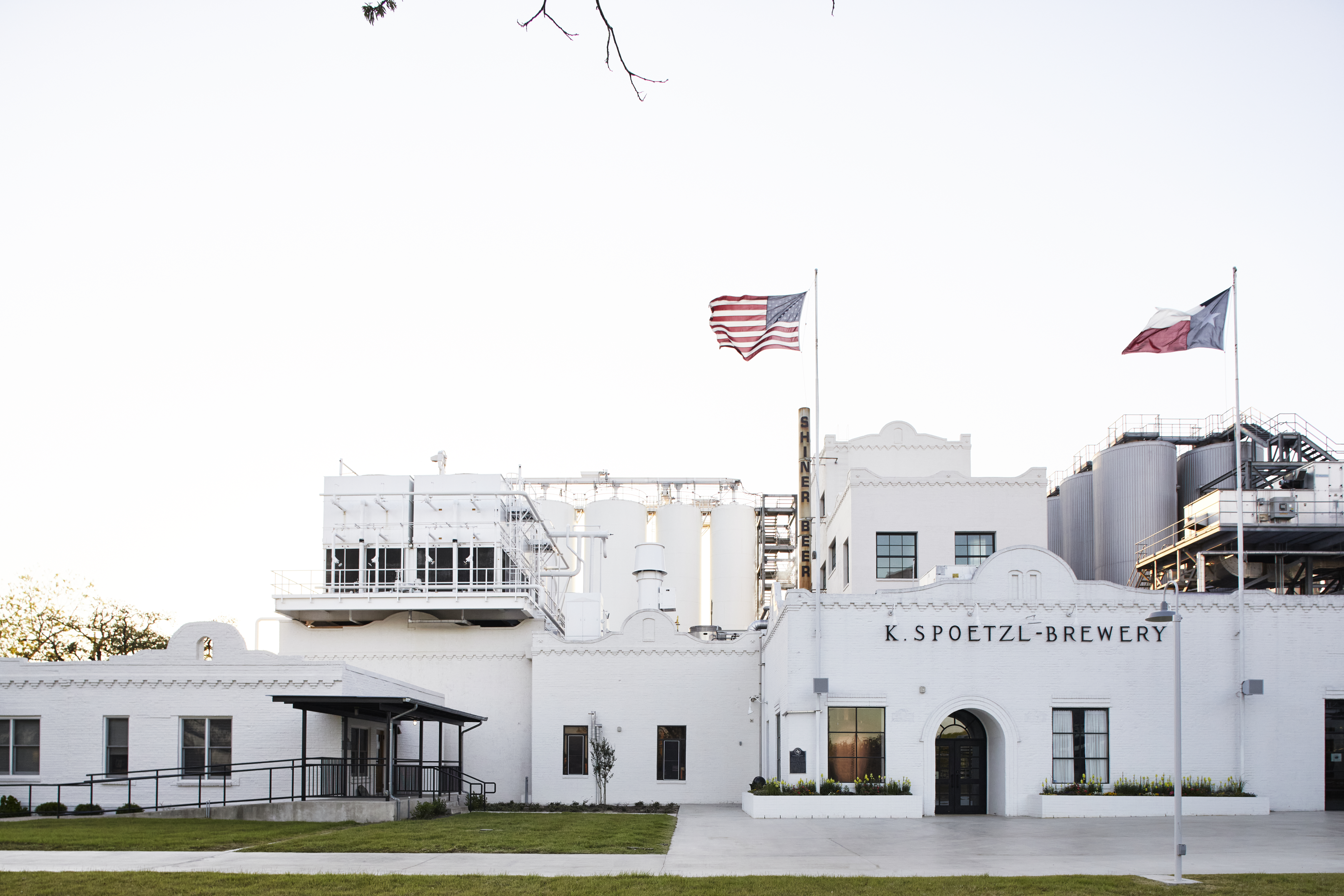
- The Spoetzl brewery, Shiner, Texas
- Founded: 1909; 117 years ago
- Founder: Shiner Brewing Association
- Headquarters: Shiner, Texas, United States
- Owner: The Gambrinus Company
- Website: www.shiner.com

Spoetzl Brewery (originally Shiner Brewing Association) is a brewery located in Shiner, Texas, United States. It produces a diverse line of Shiner beers, including their flagship Shiner Bock, a dark lager that is now distributed throughout the US. The brewery is owned by the Gambrinus Company, a family-owned company based in San Antonio, which also previously owned Trumer Brewery in Berkeley, California.

== History ==
The Spoetzl Brewery started in 1909. It was originally named The Shiner Brewing Association (SBA) and was founded by German and Czech immigrants who had settled around the central Texas town of Shiner. Unable to find the type of beer they had known in their home countries, they decided to brew their own. It is the oldest independent brewery in Texas, and one of the oldest independent breweries in the U.S. The leaders of the SBA named Herman Weiss of Galveston as the company's first brewmaster. Shiner's bock beer was originally available only in the spring per the German Lent tradition (Lentenbock). Bock beers have a long history of being brewed and consumed by Bavarian monks as a source of nutrition during times of fasting.

As the brewery gained popularity in the area, the SBA began to look for a trained professional brewmaster. They found one in Bavarian-born Kosmos Spoetzl, a onetime soldier who had trained as a brewmaster in his native Germany. Part of the package that lured Spoetzl to Shiner was potential ownership of the brewery. In 1914, he co-leased it with Oswald Petzold with an option to buy in 1915, which he did, giving the brewery his own name, but continuing to call the product Shiner Beer. Spoetzl had attended brewmaster's school and apprenticed for three years in Germany, worked for eight years at the Pyramids Brewery in Cairo, Egypt, and then worked in Canada. He had moved to San Antonio in search of a better climate for his health, bringing with him a family recipe for a Bavarian beer made from malted barley and hops.

During Prohibition, Spoetzl kept the brewery afloat by selling ice and making near beer. 13 Texas breweries in total had to close down with Spoetzl being one of a few local breweries that stayed open. Following Prohibition, Spoetzl kept things small and simple, never going more than 100 miles (160 km) for business.

In the 1970s and 1980s, the brewery's Shiner Premium Beer and Shiner Bock accounted for less than 1% of the Texas beer market. In 1983, Spoetzl produced 60,000 US beer barrels (7,000 m^{3}) of beer; in 1990, only 36,000 US beer barrels (4,200 m^{3}). Sales improved after Carlos Alvarez of San Antonio acquired the brewery in 1989. Production grew to 100,000 US beer barrels (12,000 m^{3}) in 1994, and over the next 10 years, production nearly tripled. The company now has 120 employees. As of 2012, it is the fourth-largest craft brewery in the United States.

== Products ==
Spoetzl currently produces 9 Shiner beers year-round and four Shiner seasonal brews per year.

=== Active beers ===
- Shiner Bock – Spoetzl's flagship beer, it has been brewed since 1913, almost as long as the Spoetzl Brewery has been in business. Shiner Bock was considered a Lenten beer, so was only made around that season, until a few decades ago. Today, 73% of the beer made at the Spoetzl Brewery is bock beer.
- Shiner Premium is the direct descendant of Spoetzl's earliest brew. Although Premium has carried numerous names, such as Shiner Special, Shiner Texas Special, and Shiner Blonde, the recipe has been virtually unchanged since it was first brewed in 1909. Premium was reintroduced in March 2013, featuring Shiner's famous "Cotton Boll" logo and distinctive gold packaging.
- Shiner 1909 – A pre-prohibition lager, it was inspired by the ingredients Shiner used in 1909, their founding year, and was released in 2021 as a celebration of the brewery's 112-year anniversary.
- Shiner Bruja's Brew – An IPA brewed with Amarillo hops and cactus water, it was released in 2022 under Shiner's TexHex series.
- Shiner Desert Mirage – A hazy IPA brewed with cactus water and Strata hops, it was released in 2022 under Shiner's TexHex series.
- Shiner Wicked Haze – A double IPA brewed with cactus water and cryogenically enhanced Idaho 7 hops, released in 2022 under Shiner's TexHex series.
- Shiner Twin Dream – A double IPA brewed with cactus water, Idaho 7 and Citra hops, it was released in 2022 under Shiner's TexHex series.
- Shiner Storm Caster – A juicy IPA brewed with cactus water, it was released in 2023 and is the latest in the TexHex series.
- Shiner Bohemian Black Lager – Originally a limited edition schwarzbier for the Spoetzl Brewery's 97th anniversary, it became a permanent part of the brand portfolio in late 2007. Black uses imported Czech Saaz and Styrian hops and dark-roasted malts.
- Shiner Kosmos – The original Shiner Kosmos was available in 1999 with a higher alcohol content and a different taste. This rerelease is an American Pale Lager-style beer was available only in Shiner Family Packs, one bottle per six-pack. Today it can be found in its own 6-pack at grocery stores and liquor stores in Texas.
- Shiner Prickly Pear Lager – A golden lager, it is brewed with juice from the fruit of prickly pear cactus. Once only available in Shiner Family Packs (one bottle per six-pack), it is now available year-round. It is the third in the "Brewer's Pride" Limited Edition series.
- Shiner Light Blonde – A light beer with 99 calories, it was introduced in 2011.
- Shiner Ruby Redbird – A lager brewed with Texas Ruby Red grapefruit and ginger, it originated as a summer seasonal in 2011. Popular demand led the brewery to introduce it year-round in 2015. This beer uses Munich malt and Mt Hood, Citra, and Cascade hops and it is 4.01% ABV. A repackaging as of late 2018 highlights the beer as a 95-calorie offering per 12-ounce serving.
- Shiner Órale – A Mexican-style cerveza, it was introduced in 2022.

=== Seasonal beers ===
- Holiday Cheer – Cheer is an "Old World Dunkelweizen" brewed with Texas peaches and pecans. Malted barley and wheat are used. Holiday Cheer replaced Shiner Dunkelweizen as the brewery's winter seasonal.
- Shiner Oktoberfest – A Märzen-style seasonal beer, it has a deep amber color and a slightly toasted flavor. It was first introduced as the 96th-anniversary brew.
- Shiner Birthday Beer – A stout brewed with chocolate malt and real cocoa, in 2015, Birthday Beer honored the brewery's anniversary and served as Shiner's spring seasonal beer. Although the name will stay the same, the style will change each year.
- Shiner Prickly Pear – A light lager, it is brewed with the fruit of prickly pear cactus, which is common in Texas and actually grows on the brewery grounds. Prickly Pear was previously available in the Family Reunion packages.
- Shiner Strawberry Blonde – A summer seasonal beer brewed with strawberries, it combines pale and wheat ales with strawberries grown in Poteet, Texas.
- Shiner Sea Salt & Lime Summer Lager – A light lager brewed with sea salt and lime peel, it was introduced in 2018 as a standalone product and as part of the rotating flavors in the company's seasonal "Texas Heat Wave" assortment pack
- Shiner Weisse 'N' Easy – An unfiltered wheat beer, in the tradition of Berliner Weisse, it is brewed with Texas-grown dewberries and introduced in 2020.

=== Previously offered beers ===
- Dortmunder – A spring ale in the Dortmunder style, it has the malt profile of a Helles and the hop character of a Pils, but is slightly stronger than both. The brew is a renamed version of Shiner Fröst, and was released as the new spring seasonal in 2011.
- Fröst – Shiner Fröst uses two-row malted barley, malted wheat, and Munich malt for a full-bodied flavor. Hallertau Tradition and Spalter select hops contribute to the aroma. Fröst has an alcohol content of 5.5% by volume, a bitterness of 25 IBU and color of 8 SRM.
- Smokehaus – Spoetzl's smoked Sommer beer is brewed with pale malt that has been smoked with native mesquite. Smokehaus has a 4.89 ABV and an IBU of 16.
- Shiner FM 966 – A farmhouse-style ale brewed with Golding, Sterling, and Meridian hops, it was released as Shiner's new spring seasonal in 2013. It was named for the road that runs south of the brewery.
- Shiner Hefeweizen – An unfiltered Bavarian-style wheat beer, it was discontinued in 2015 and replaced by White Wing.
- Shiner Old-Time Alt was available in Shiner Family Packs (1 bottle per 6-pack) and was the first in the "Brewer's Pride" Limited Edition series.
- Shiner Ryes & Shine – A rye lager, it was available in Shiner Family Packs (1 bottle per 6-pack) and was the second in the "Brewer's Pride" Limited Edition series.
- Shiner White Wing – A witbier brewed with Belgian yeast with hints of orange peel and coriander, it was discontinued in 2017.
- Shiner Wild Hare Pale Ale – A classic American pale ale brewed with Munich malt with U.S. Golding and Bravo hop varieties. Discontinued in 2015 and replaced by Ruby Redbird.
- Shiner Wicked Ram IPA – Shiner's first IPA, it was brewed with Crystal, Bravo, and Centennial hops.
- Shiner Homespun – a cream ale, it is full-bodied.

=== Anniversary celebration ===
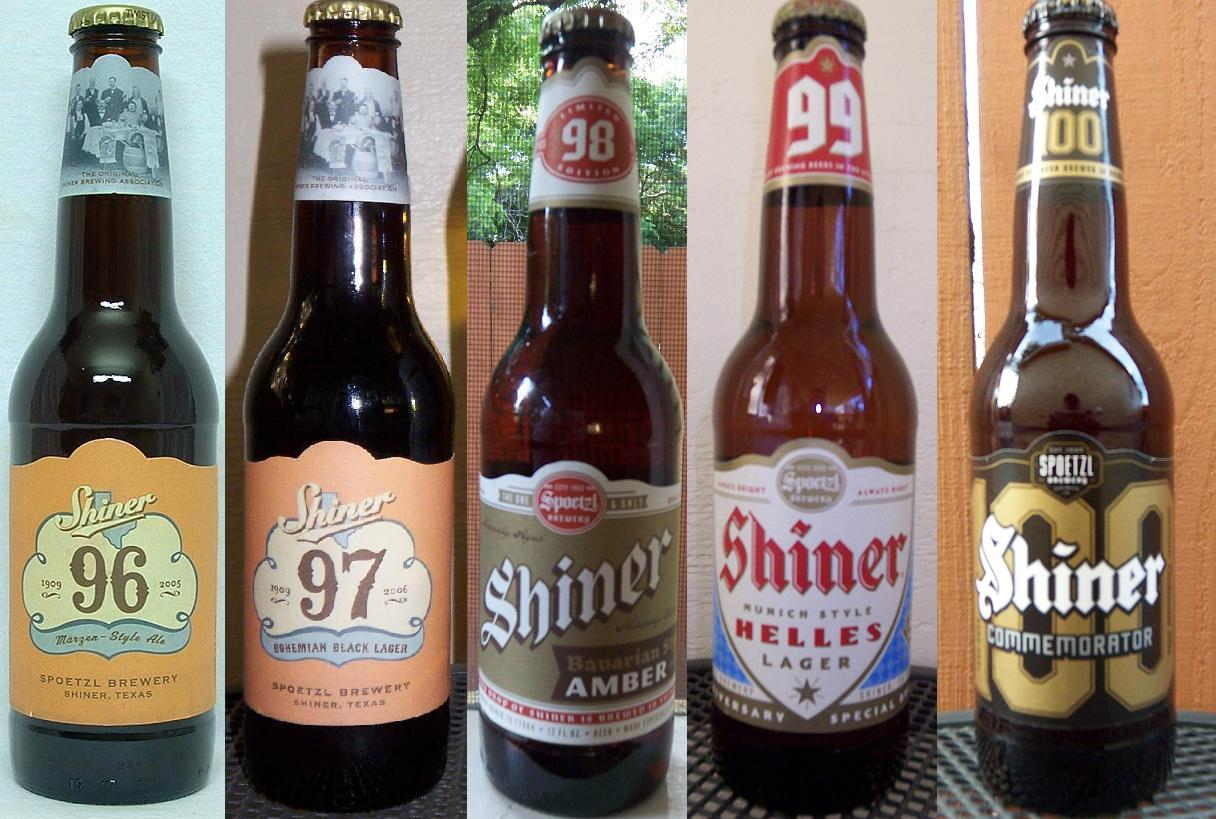
Shiner's Centennial celebration beers

In 2005, Spoetzl began producing an annual brew in a progressive, anticipatory celebration of its 2009 centennial anniversary. The centennial program developed and produced one yearly special beer in small batches. The name of each such specialty beer corresponded to the age of the brewery: Shiner 96 was the specialty beer of 2005, Shiner 97 for 2006, etc. For the first two years, Spoetzl brewed Shiner 96 and Shiner 97 only from September through mid-December. In 2007, Shiner 98 was released four months earlier – in May – while Shiner 99 (2008) entered the market another two months earlier, in March.

Shiner 100 had the longest run of all the anniversary beers, seeing production all year long in 2009. After each beer's specified production run has ended, that year's beer is retired. However, Shiner 97 proved to be so popular that in 2008, Spoetzl brought the beer back as Shiner Bohemian Black Lager and made it a permanent offering. The Spoetzl Brewery originally intended to conclude its centennial beer production in 2009, but decided to continue the annual program indefinitely.

For 2009, Spoetzl changed the neck label for all their beers. The labels proclaimed Spoetzl's 100th anniversary and include the tag line "Here's to a century of independent brewing. Prosit!"

The annual brews and their respective styles are:

- Shiner 96 – Märzen/Oktoberfest
- Shiner 97 – Bohemian Black Lager
- Shiner 98 – Bavarian Style Amber
- Shiner 99 – Munich Style Helles Lager
- Shiner 100 Commemorator – Starkbier
- Shiner 101 – Czech-style Pilsner
- Shiner 102 – American Style Double Wheat Ale
- Shiner 103 – Wild Hare Pale Ale
- Shiner 104 – White Wing Belgian White Ale
- Shiner 106 Birthday Beer – Chocolate Stout
- Shiner 107 Birthday Beer – Hoppy Pilsner
- Shiner 108 Birthday Beer – Cold-Brew Coffee Ale (a collaboration with Chameleon Cold-Brew of Austin, Texas)
- Shiner 109 Birthday Beer – Farmhouse Rye
- Shiner 110 – S'more Chocolate and Marshmallow Ale
- Shiner 111 – Rerelease of Shiner 110's S'more Chocolate and Marshmallow Ale

=== Other beers ===
Spoetzl created "Devil Beer" in 1987, sold to fans of the Arizona State Sun Devils. The brewery also licensed the Boulder Brewery of Colorado to sell its "Boulder Sport" in the late '80s.

== Marketing ==
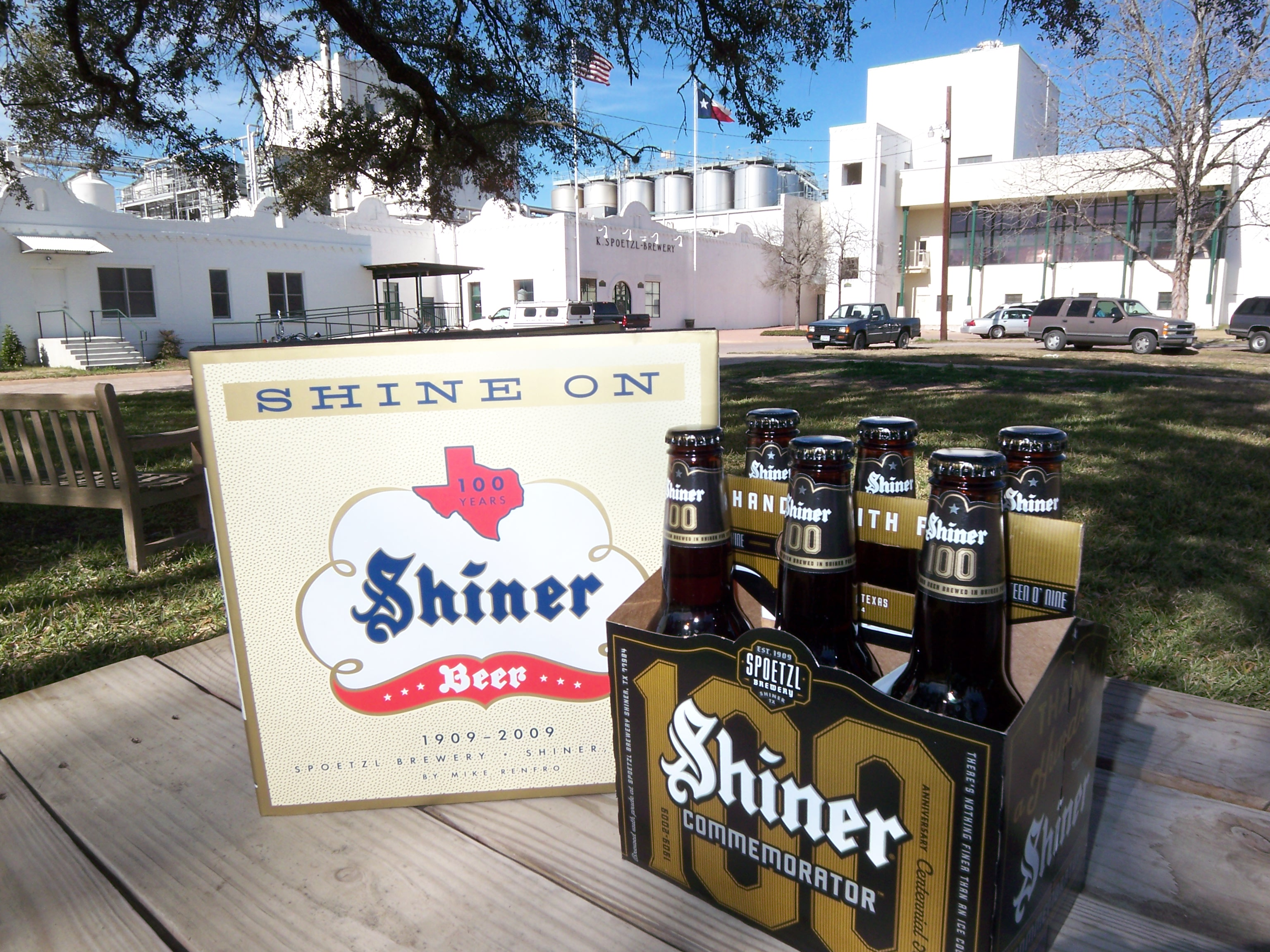
Shine On & a 6-pack of Shiner 100 at the Spoetzl Brewery

Shine On is a coffee table book by Dallas author Mike Renfro, which documents the little brewery's history in photos as well as story. The book follows the brewery from 1909 to 2008. In addition to the history on the brewery, Shine On also includes the history of the town, as well as a look at some of the people responsible for making Shiner beer.

Working with their Austin-based advertising agency, McGarrah Jessee, Shiner's guerilla marketing efforts at the Austin City Limits Music Festival have consistently promoted their brand. In 2010, the company created the "Shiner Beer Local Stage", which featured a two-day lineup of local bands performing on a custom stage constructed under two billboards near Zilker Park. In 2012, a beer garden, complete with a replica of the Spoetzl brewery facade, was added.

== In popular culture ==
In 2012, country artist Jason Aldean changed a reference to Shiner Bock a few weeks after releasing the song "Take a Little Ride". The original lyric, "grab a little Shiner Bock" was replaced with "grab a couple Rocky Tops" when Aldean signed a sponsorship contract with Coors Brewing Company.

== Images ==
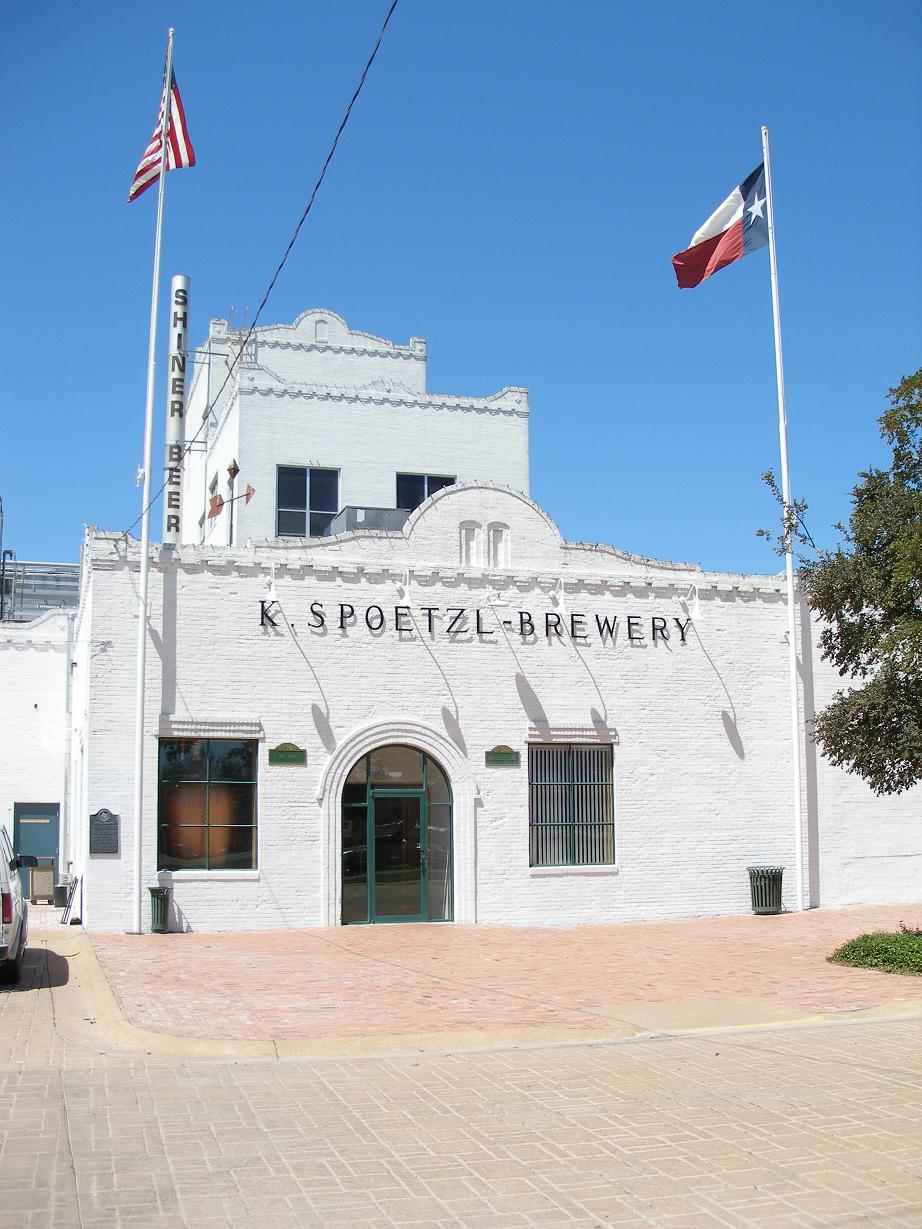
The main patron entrance is through the hospitality room and gift shop.

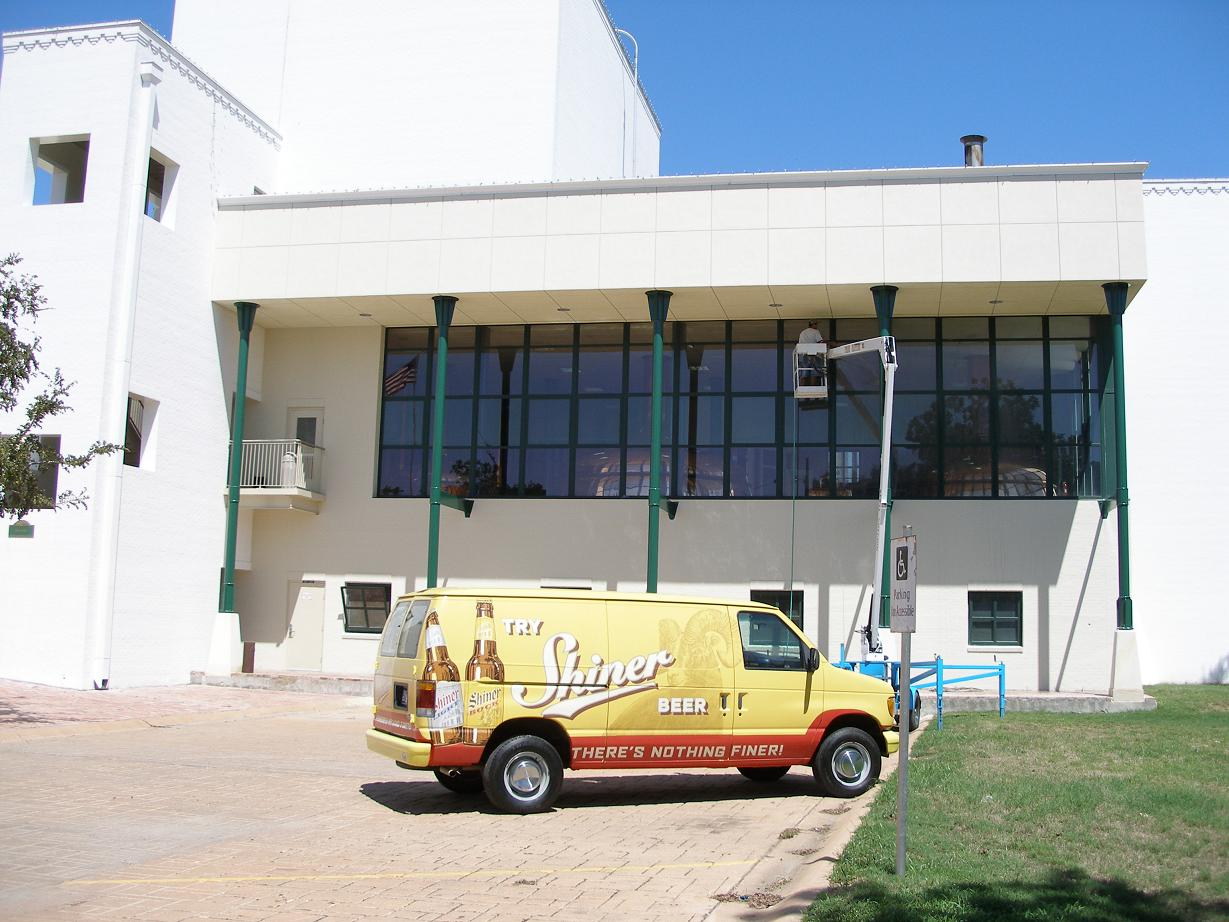
New brewhouse

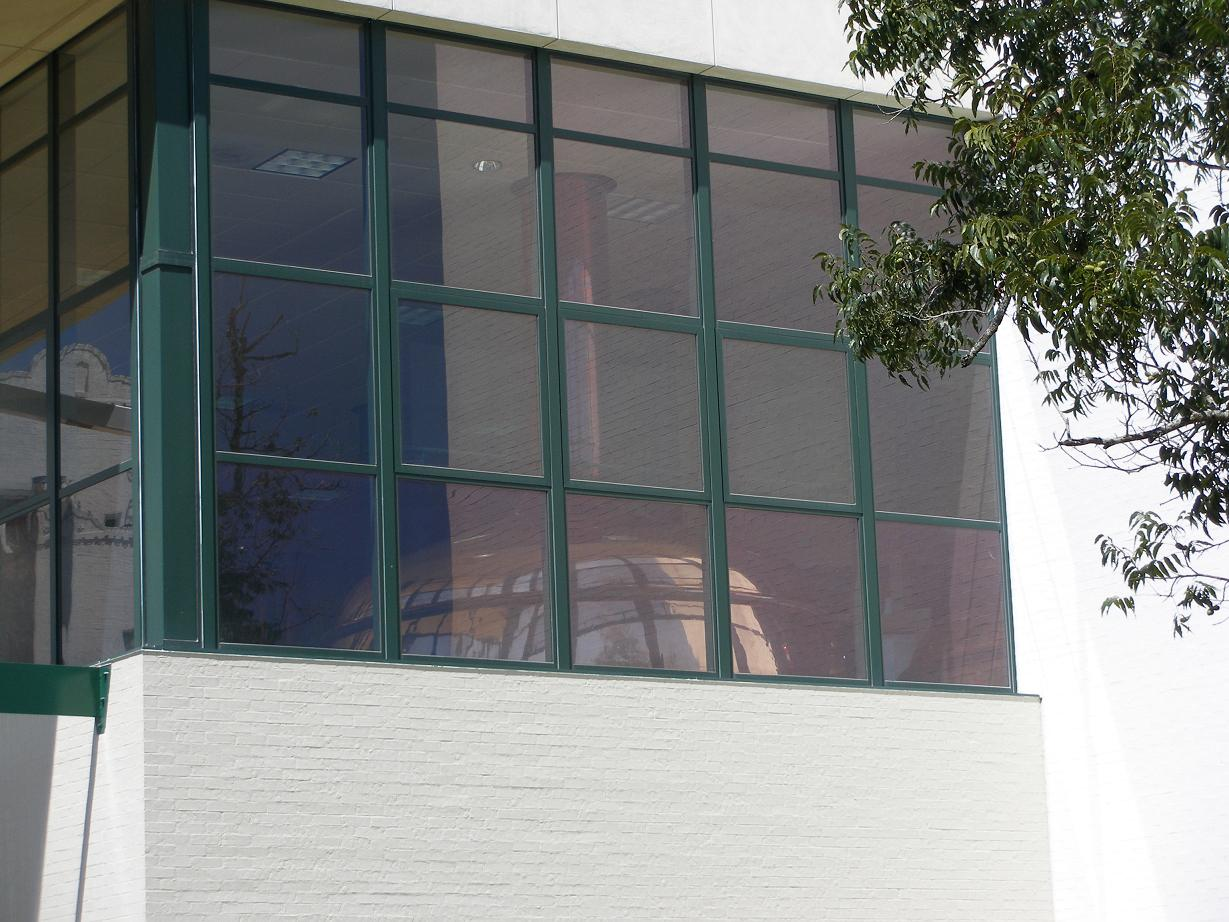
Closeup of new brew kettles

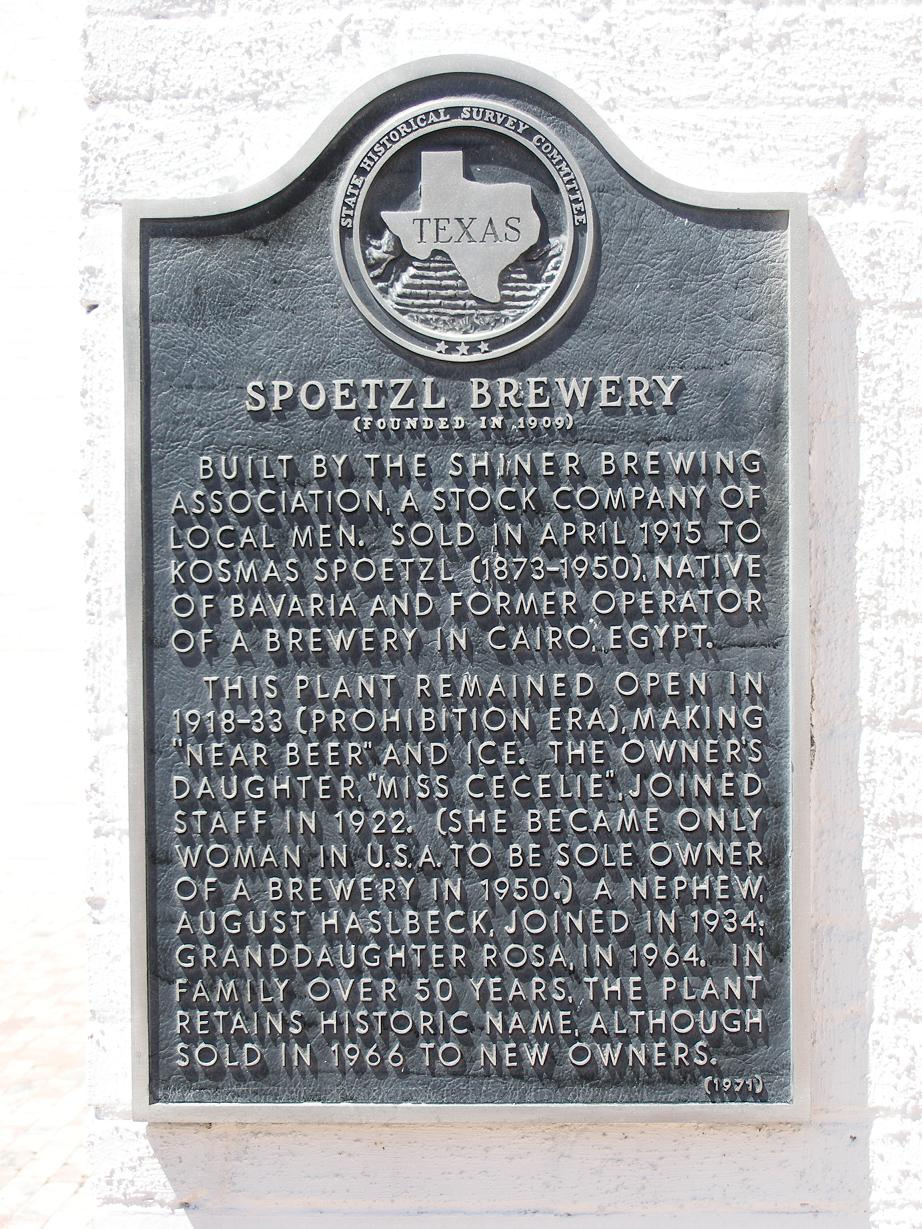
A Texas historic marker was placed on the site in 1971.

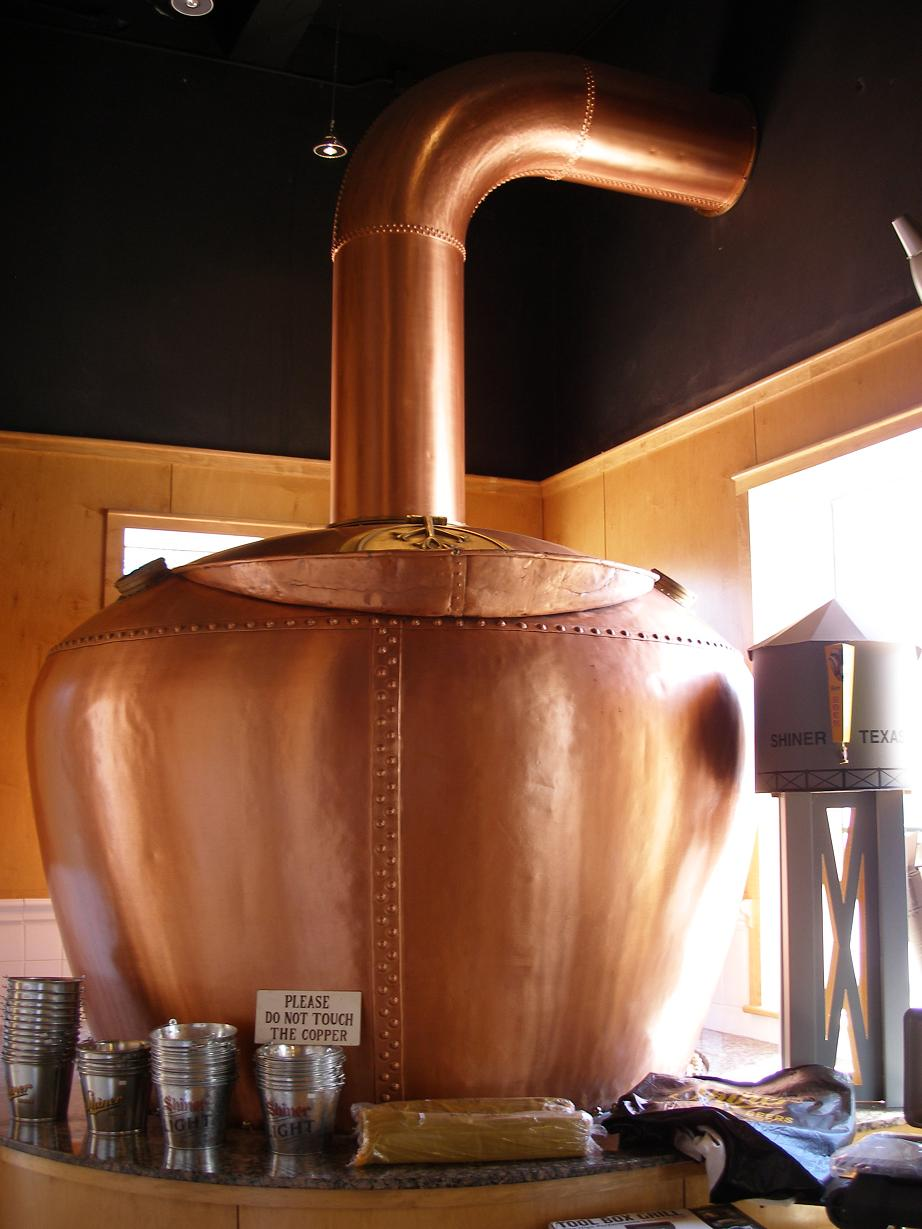
Retired paper-thin brew kettle

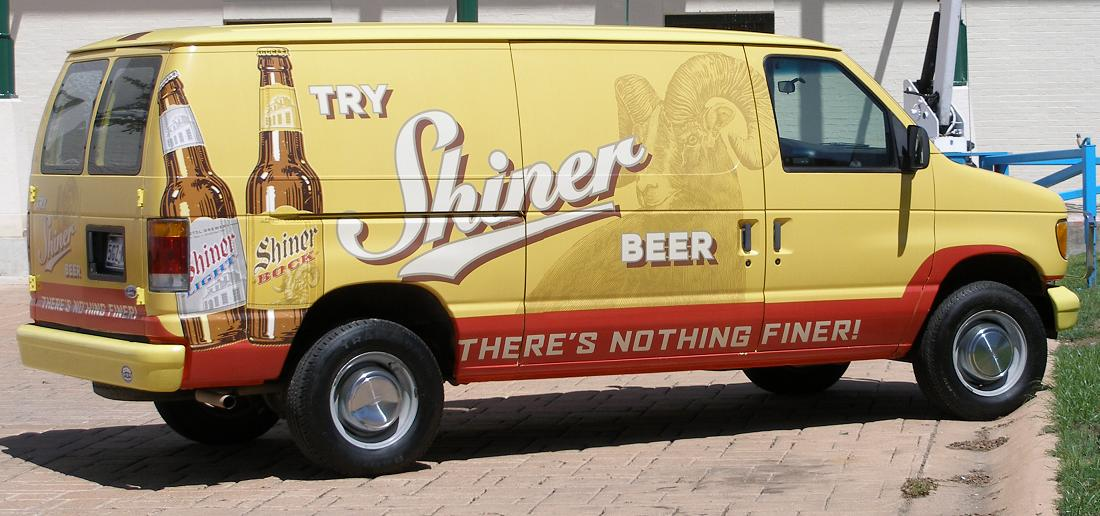
Detail of a Shiner van
