= Ranch Hand Truck Accessories =

- Type: Private company
- Industry: Truck Accessories
- Founded: 1986
- Headquarters: Shiner, Texas, United States
- Number of locations: 100,000 sq. ft. manufacturing plant 60,000 sq. ft. satellite manufacturing plan 60,000 sq. ft. warehouse
- Area served: United States and Canada
- Products: Grille Guards; Bumper Replacements; Headache Racks and Haulers; Toolboxes
- Number of employees: 190 (2010)
- Website: www.ranchhand.com

Ranch Hand is an American manufacturer of aftermarket accessories for heavy duty trucks.

== History ==
Established in 1986, Ranch Hand was founded in Boerne, Texas. Their original product was a grille guard which they called a "donkey knocker." In January 2000 it was acquired by the Kaspar Companies, a family owned group of businesses. The Kaspar Companies merged their brand, Kaspar Ranch Gear, with the Ranch Hand brand name and in 2001 moved all manufacturing to their central location in Shiner, Texas.

As of 2025, Ranch Hand employs over 190 individuals across two primary manufacturing facilities. The original facility, encompassing 100,000 square feet (9,300 m^{2}), is located in Shiner, Texas. A newer 65,000 square feet (6,000 m^{2}) warehouse and distribution center has been established in Beeville, Texas, which also houses a full-scale paint and packaging line.

Over time, the brand grew and now today, Ranch Hand's products are sold through company owned stores, distributors, new truck dealerships, and Truck/SUV accessory dealers. Direct sales in the US are focused primarily on factory outlet stores located in Texas, Colorado and Oklahoma. Their dealer network covers most of the US and parts of Canada.

== Products ==
Ranch Hand manufactures grille guards, push bars, front end replacements, back bumper replacements for full size pickup trucks and SUVs as well as various smaller products such as steps, headache racks, haulers and toolboxes.

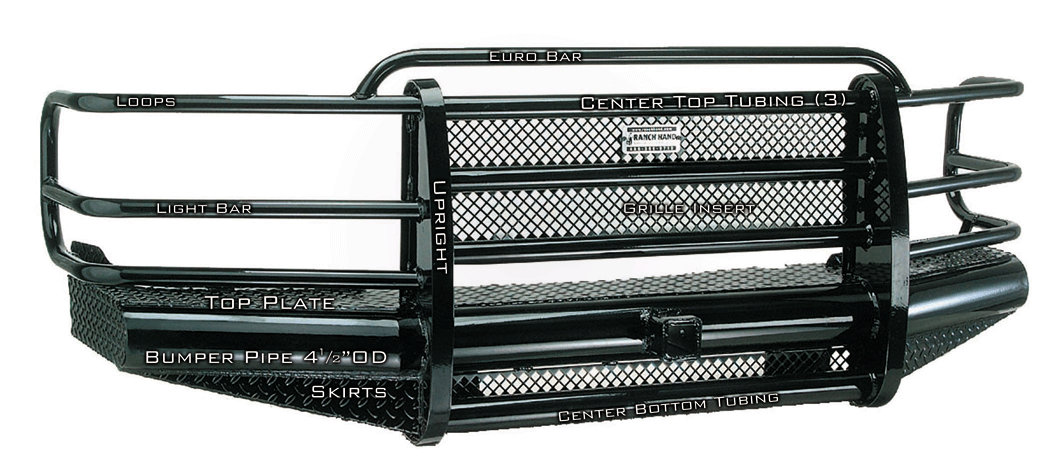
Anatomy of a Ranch Hand Front Bumper

Some significant differences in the product were developed. Instead of painting products, a new super polyester baked finish was developed. Expanded metal, commonly used as the mesh for barbecue grills, was replaced with a higher quality custom punched insert, which is custom made to match the make and the model of the vehicle. Their products are also fully welded and mount directly to the vehicle frame. They also use custom punched grille inserts to match the make and model of the vehicle the grille is being mounted on.

The company also produces various fleet products targeting emergency vehicles, including police patrol cars and fire & rescue vehicles. In June 2010, they released a niche market product called the Wind Bed for wind farm maintenance crews.

They currently have products for the full size vehicles produced by General Motors, Toyota, Chevrolet, Ford Motor Company, Dodge, and Jeep

== Brand image and marketing ==
Ranch Hand manufactures heavy-duty accessories for pickup trucks and sport utility vehicles(SUVs), including products designed for recent vehicle models. The company's logo and branding have changed over time. Marketing materials have emphasized durability and reliability, while the brand has been associated with rural ranchers and workers in agricultural and trade occupations.

The company is a member of SEMA automotive aftermarket show where they exhibit their product line and update dealers on new models and updates.

Ranch Hand grille guards and front end replacements do offer a degree of protection, in accidents ranging from fender benders to head on collisions, but the company will not claim protection as one of their selling points with their marketing in order to avoid liability issues.
