= Shiner, Texas =

- City
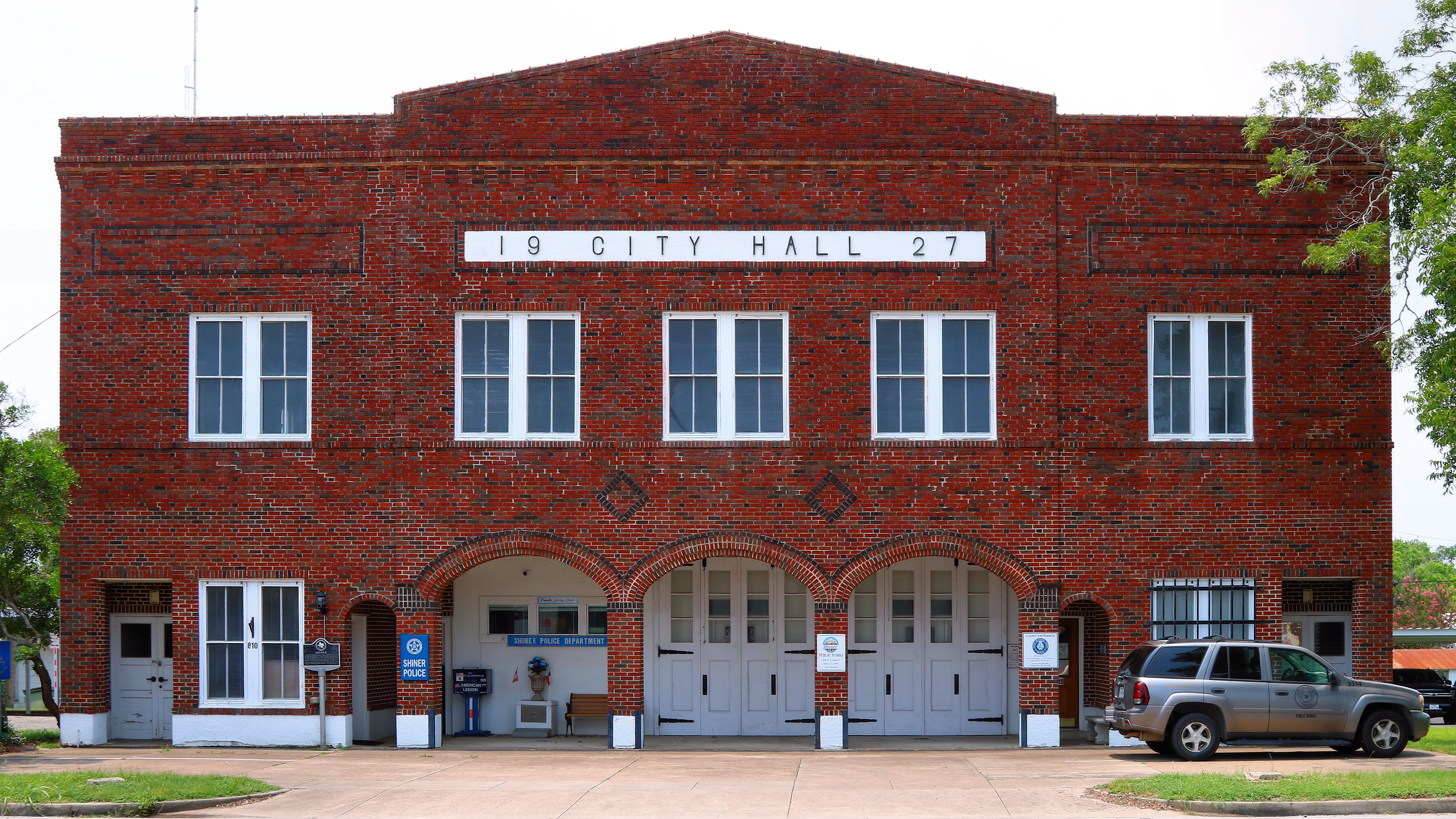
- Shiner City Hall
- Motto: "Cleanest Little City in Texas"
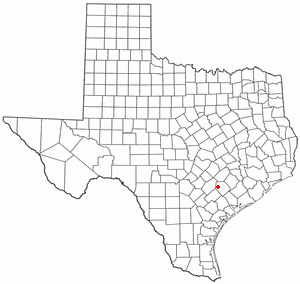
- Location of Shiner, Texas

- Coordinates: 29°25′51″N 97°10′20″W
- Country: United States
- State: Texas
- County: Lavaca

Area
  - Total: 2.47 sq mi (6.41 km^{2})
  - Land: 2.47 sq mi (6.39 km^{2})
  - Water: 0.0077 sq mi (0.02 km^{2})
- Elevation: 358 ft (109 m)

Population (2020)
  - Total: 2,127
  - Density: 875.9/sq mi (338.18/km^{2})
- Time zone: UTC-6 (Central (CST))
  - Summer (DST): UTC-5 (CDT)
- ZIP code: 77984
- Area code: 361
- FIPS code: 48-67640
- GNIS feature ID: 1347067
- Website: ShinerTexas.gov

Shiner is a city in Lavaca County, Texas, United States. The town was named after Henry B. Shiner, who donated 250 acres (1.0 km^{2}) for a railroad right-of-way. As of the 2020 census, the city had a population of 2,127. Shiner was founded by German and Czech emigrants.

== History ==
In 1885, a post office called Half Moon was opened at a trading post near the present site of Shiner. In 1887, Henry B. Shiner donated 250 acres for a depot and right-of-way for the San Antonio and Arkansas Pass Railway, which bypassed Half Moon and was built through Henry B. Shiner's donated land. The town grew around these transportation facilities. The town initially called itself "New Half Moon", but in 1888, the town's name was changed to Shiner and the town was incorporated in 1890.

Czech and German immigrants soon became the dominant ethnic groups, and Shiner developed a cohesive Czech community that still heavily influences the town's culture. Ranching was an important part of the town's history.

Historically notable families of the area are the Wolters and Welhausen families, after whom the Edwin Wolters Memorial Museum and the Shiner Welhausen Park are named, respectively.

Shiner is the home of the Spoetzl Brewery, the oldest independent brewery in Texas. The brewery is most well known for producing Shiner Bock, a dark German/Czech-style beer that is now distributed in 50 states.

Shiner is also the home of the historic Kaspar Companies, one of the oldest continuously operating companies in America. Kaspar Companies is a holding company that currently consists of Ranch Hand Truck Accessories, Texas Precious Metals, and several other businesses.

== Geography ==
According to the United States Census Bureau, the city has a total area of 2.4 square miles (6.2 km^{2}), of which 0.41% is covered by water.

== Demographics ==
Historical population
Census	Pop.	Note	%±
1890	340		—
1900	845		148.5%
1910	1,096		29.7%
1920	1,300		18.6%
1930	1,372		5.5%
1940	1,520		10.8%
1950	1,778		17.0%
1960	1,945		9.4%
1970	2,102		8.1%
1980	2,213		5.3%
1990	2,074		−6.3%
2000	2,070		−0.2%
2010	2,069		0.0%
2020	2,127		2.8%
U.S. Decennial Census

As of the 2020 census, 2,127 people resided in the city.

=== Racial and ethnic composition ===
Shiner city, Texas – Racial composition Note: the US Census treats Hispanic/Latino as an ethnic category. This table excludes Latinos from the racial categories and assigns them to a separate category. Hispanics/Latinos may be of any race.
Race (NH = Non-Hispanic)	% 2020	% 2010	% 2000	Pop 2020	Pop 2010	Pop 2000
White alone (NH)	75.8%	81.4%	82.2%	1,612	1,685	1,702
Black alone (NH)	7.3%	9.3%	10.8%	156	193	224
American Indian alone (NH)	0.3%	0.2%	0%	7	4	1
Asian alone (NH)	0.3%	0.4%	0.2%	6	8	4
Pacific Islander alone (NH)	0%	0%	0%	0	0	0
Other race alone (NH)	0.2%	0%	0%	5	1	1
Multiracial (NH)	3.4%	1.1%	0.6%	73	22	12
Hispanic/Latino (any race)	12.6%	7.5%	6.1%	268	156	126

=== 2020 census ===
The median age was 42.1 years. 24.1% of residents were under the age of 18 and 23.2% of residents were 65 years of age or older. For every 100 females there were 90.4 males, and for every 100 females age 18 and over there were 83.0 males age 18 and over.

0.0% of residents lived in urban areas, while 100.0% lived in rural areas.

There were 841 households in Shiner, of which 32.8% had children under the age of 18 living in them. Of all households, 49.8% were married-couple households, 15.6% were households with a male householder and no spouse or partner present, and 29.4% were households with a female householder and no spouse or partner present. About 29.6% of all households were made up of individuals and 17.4% had someone living alone who was 65 years of age or older.

There were 1,017 housing units, of which 17.3% were vacant. The homeowner vacancy rate was 3.1% and the rental vacancy rate was 8.3%.

The most reported ancestries in 2020 were:

- German (27%)
- Czech (20.5%)
- Mexican (11.2%)
- English (10.8%)
- Irish (7.6%)
- African American (5.2%)
- Italian (1.9%)
- Scottish (1.7%)
- French (1.3%)

Racial composition as of the 2020 census
Race	Number	Percent
White	1,702	80.0%
Black or African American	161	7.6%
American Indian and Alaska Native	12	0.6%
Asian	6	0.3%
Native Hawaiian and Other Pacific Islander	0	0.0%
Some other race	63	3.0%
Two or more races	183	8.6%
Hispanic or Latino (of any race)	268	12.6%

=== 2000 census ===
As of the census of 2000, 2,070 people, 882 households, and 572 families resided in the city. The population density was 849.9 inhabitants per square mile (328.1/km^{2}). The 1,016 housing units had an average density of 417.1/sq mi (160.8/km^{2}). The racial makeup of the city was 85.60% White, 10.87% African American, 0.05% Native American, 0.29% Asian, 1.93% from other races, and 1.26% from two or more races. Hispanics or Latinos of any race were 6.09% of the population.

Of the 882 households, 26.6% had children under 18 living with them, 51.1% were married couples living together, 10.7% had a female householder with no husband present, and 35.1% were not families. About 33.4% of all households were made up of individuals, and 22.9% had someone living alone who was 65 or older. The average household size was 2.25, and the average family size was 2.86.

In the city, the age distribution was 21.8% under 18, 5.4% from 18 to 24, 23.1% from 25 to 44, 20.9% from 45 to 64, and 28.7% who were 65 or older. The median age was 45 years. For every 100 females, there were 80.9 males. For every 100 females 18, and over, there were 74.9 males.

The median income for a household in the city was $28,205, and for a family was $40,250. Males had a median income of $28,167 versus $17,426 for females. The per capita income for the city was $16,942. About 7.4% of families and 11.5% of the population were below the poverty line, including 10.7% of those under 18 and 21.0% of those 65 or over.

== Education ==
The City of Shiner is served by the Shiner Independent School District and home to the Shiner High School Comanches. The city is also served by Shiner Catholic School, which operates St. Paul High School and St. Ludmila Elementary School.

== Climate ==
Climate data for Shiner, Texas
Month	Jan	Feb	Mar	Apr	May	Jun	Jul	Aug	Sep	Oct	Nov	Dec	Year
Mean daily maximum °F (°C)	63.0 (17.2)	67.0 (19.4)	74.0 (23.3)	80.0 (26.7)	86.0 (30.0)	92.0 (33.3)	95.0 (35.0)	96.0 (35.6)	91.0 (32.8)	83.0 (28.3)	73.0 (22.8)	65.0 (18.3)	80.4 (26.9)
Mean daily minimum °F (°C)	40.0 (4.4)	44.0 (6.7)	51.0 (10.6)	58.0 (14.4)	66.0 (18.9)	71.0 (21.7)	73.0 (22.8)	72.0 (22.2)	68.0 (20.0)	59.0 (15.0)	50.0 (10.0)	43.0 (6.1)	57.9 (14.4)
Average precipitation inches (mm)	2.7 (69)	2.0 (51)	2.8 (71)	3.5 (89)	4.4 (110)	4.0 (100)	2.8 (71)	3.6 (91)	3.9 (99)	4.3 (110)	3.0 (76)	2.5 (64)	39.5 (1,001)
Average precipitation days	5	5	5	4	5	5	5	5	6	5	5	5	60
Source: NOAA

== Media ==
Shiner's weekly newspaper, The Shiner Gazette, was established in 1892.

== Notable people ==
- Jeremy Fikac (2001–2004), MLB pitcher for the San Diego Padres, Oakland Athletics, and Montreal Expos
- Logan Ondrusek (2010– ), MLB pitcher for the Cincinnati Reds and Baltimore Orioles
- Zachary Reese, UFC middleweight fighter
- Vic Roznovsky (1964–1969), MLB catcher for the Chicago Cubs, Baltimore Orioles, and Philadelphia Phillies
- Carroll Sembera (1965–1970), MLB pitcher for the Houston Astros and Montreal Expos
- Ross Youngs (1917–1926), MLB baseball player with the New York Giants and member of the Baseball Hall of Fame
