= Trumer Pils =

Austrian beer, also made in California

Coordinates: 47.937104°N 13.078238°E

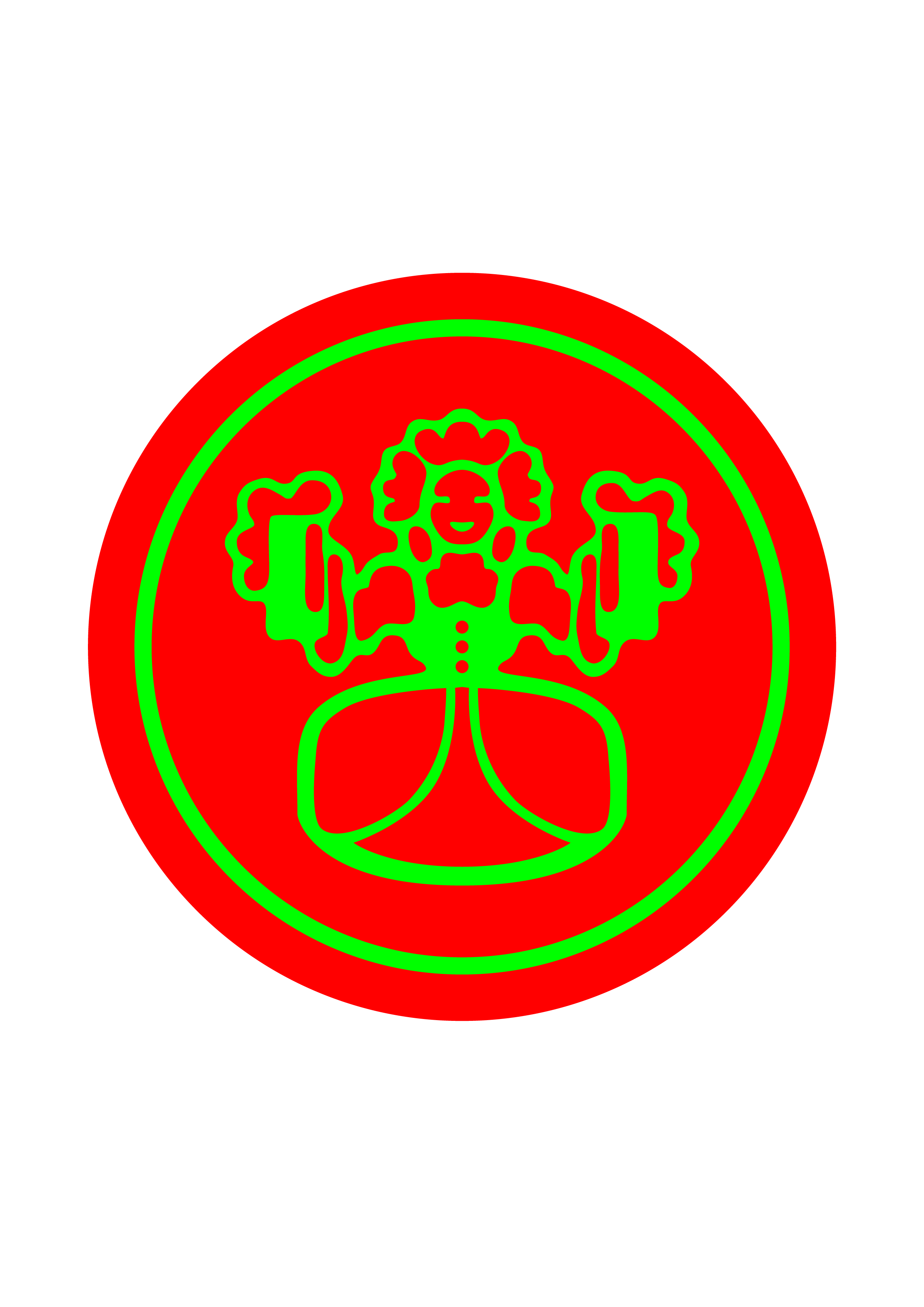
- Type: Beer
- Manufacturer: Privatbrauerei Josef Sigl; The Gambrinus Company owned by Carlos Alvarez
- Origin: Austria
- Alcohol by volume: 4.9%
- IBU scale: 26
- Website: Trumer International

Trumer Pils is a pilsner beer from Austria, originally sold almost exclusively in the federal state of Salzburg. Brewed by Firestone Walker Brewing Company, in Paso Robles California, since 2026 to provide beer for the U.S. market.

Trumer is characterized by hoppy bitterness, high carbonation and a light body and is brewed according to the German Reinheitsgebot.

== History ==
Trumer Brauerei has been brewing beer for 400 years in Austria. Pilsner beer was first brewed in 1842 in the city of Plzeň (German: Pilsen) in Bohemia, today the Czech Republic.

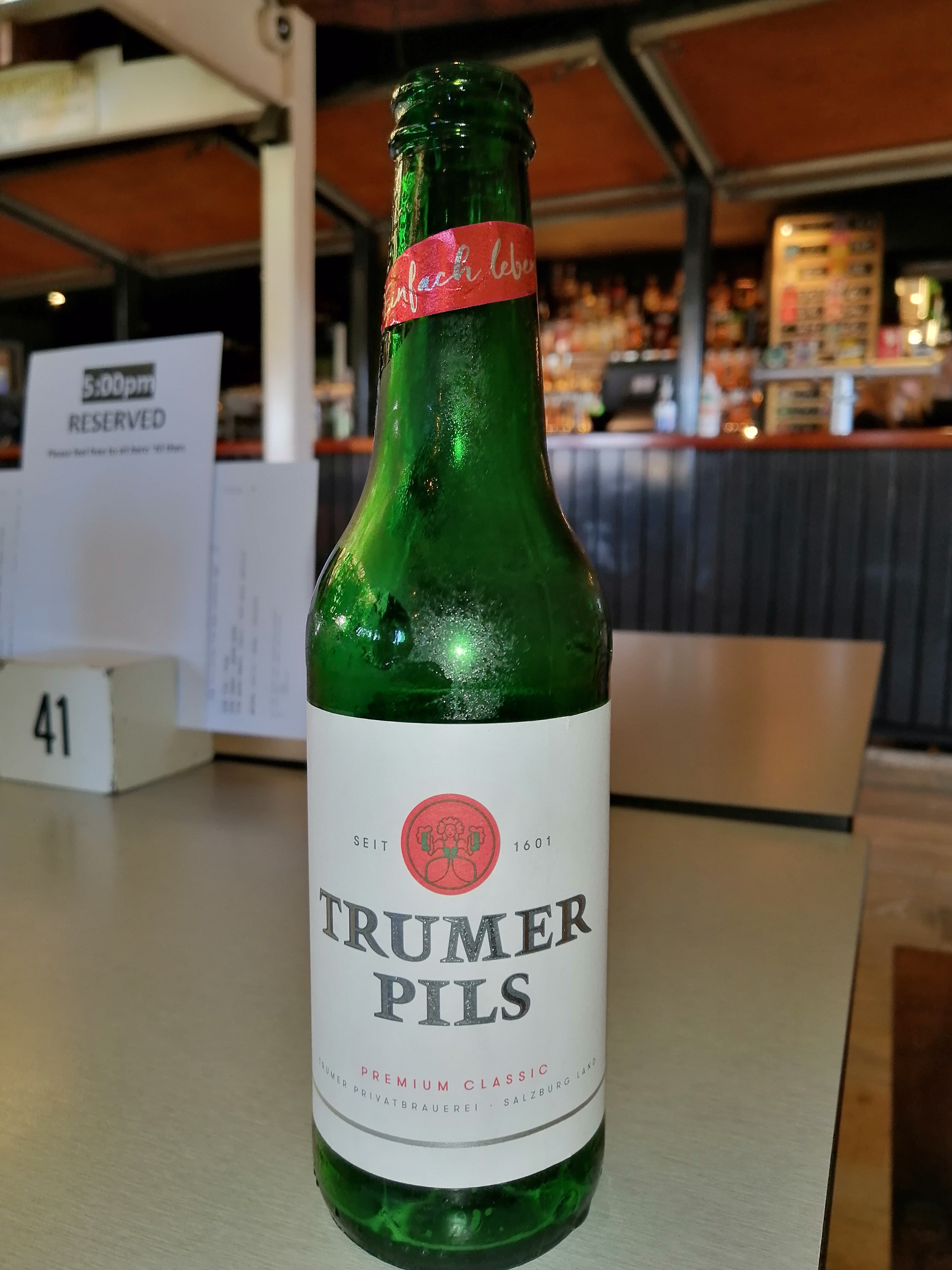
330mL bottle of Trumer Pils

After opening a brewery in Berkeley, Trumer Pils became widely available in the San Francisco Bay Area in addition to its native Austria, the result of a partnership between Privatbrauerei Josef Sigl and the Gambrinus Company. All ingredients used in Berkeley are shipped from Austria with the exception of the water which is from the High Sierras. Hops used in the recipe include Czech Saaz, German Hallertau Perle, and Spalt Select. Trumer is aged six weeks prior to bottling.

Trumer Pils was acquired by Duvel Moortgat in 2026. The Berkeley facility at 1404 Fourth Street permanently shut its doors at the end of May 2026. Brewing operations were relocated to Firestone Walker Brewing Company.

== Distribution ==
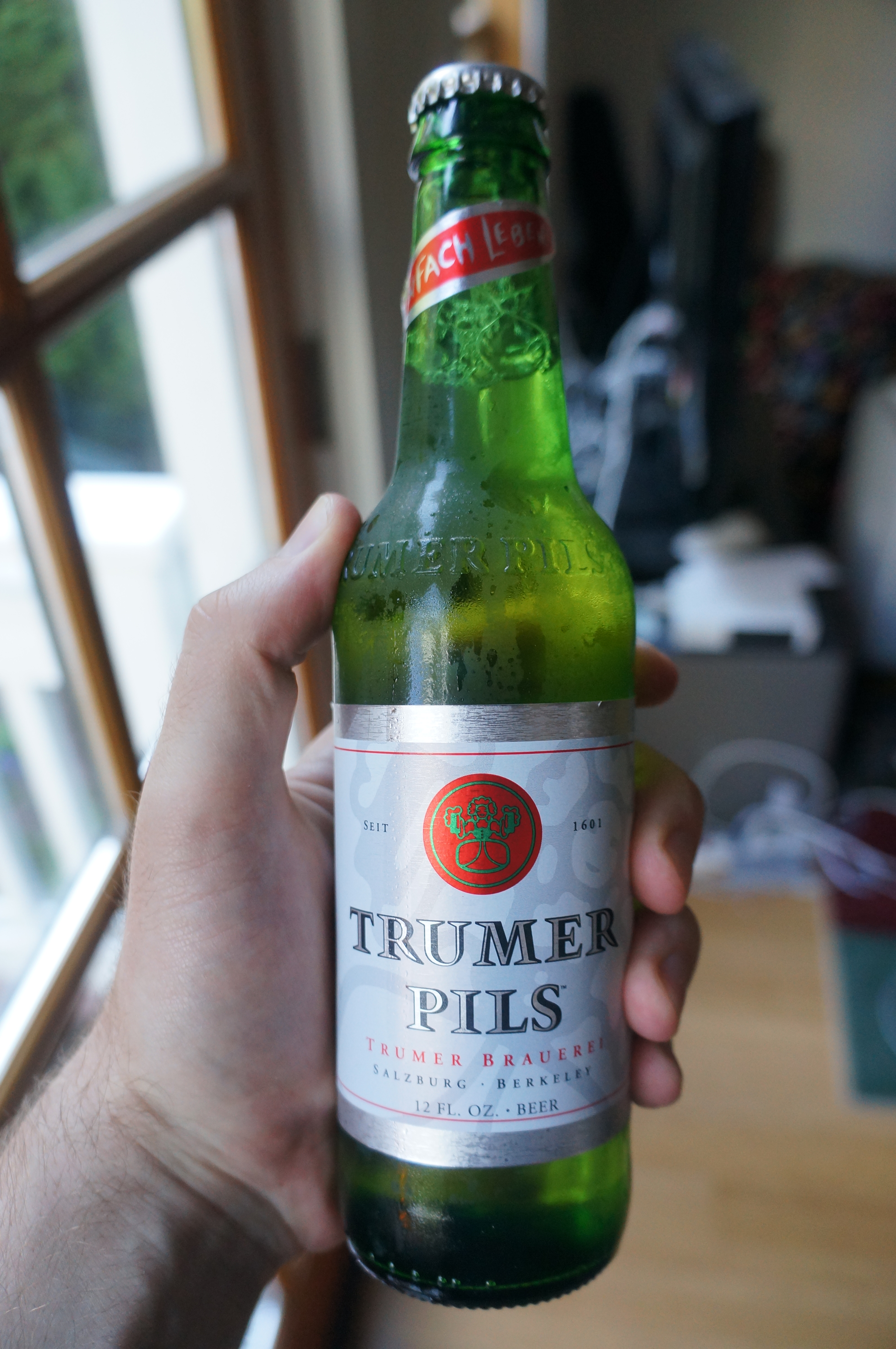
A bottle of Trumer Pils

Since 2004, Trumer Pils has expanded its distribution to Seattle, Portland, Chicago, Dallas, Austin, Denver, San Diego and Los Angeles. Trumer Australia, has been distributing Trumer Pils to the Australian market since the early 2000s

== Recognition ==
- Gold medal at the World Beer Cup for Best German-style pilsner, 2016.
- Silver medal at the World Beer Cup for Best German-style pilsner, 2010.
- Gold medal at the World Beer Cup for Best German-style pilsner, 2008.
- Gold medal at the World Beer Cup for Best German-style pilsner, 2006.
- Gold Medal 2017 Australian International Beer Awards (AIBA) for Best German-style pilsner
- Silver Medal 2016 Australian International Beer Awards (AIBA) German Style Pilsner.
- Trophy for Best Pilsner & Gold Medal at the 2015 Australian International Beer Awards (AIBA) German Style Pilsner (Best Pilsner).
- Silver Medal 2014 Australian International Beer Awards (AIBA) German Style Pilsner.
- Silver Medal 2013 Australian International Beer Awards (AIBA) German Style Pilsner.
- Silver Medal 2012 Australian International Beer Awards (AIBA) German Style Pilsner.
- Gold Medal 2010 Australian International Beer Awards (AIBA) Pilsner.
- Bronze Medal 2009 Australian International Beer Awards (AIBA) Pilsner.
- Silver Medal 2008 Australian International Beer Awards (AIBA) Pilsner.
- Gold Medal at the European Beer Star for Best German-style pilsner 2012.
- Bronze Medal at the European Beer Star for Best German-style pilsner 2009.
- Gold Medal at the European Beer Star for Best German-style pilsner 2008.
- Gold Medal at the European Beer Star for Best German-style pilsner 2006.
- Gold Medal at the European Beer Star for Best German-style pilsner 2004.
- Gold medal at the Great American Beer Festival for Best German-style pilsner, 2010.
- Silver medal at the Great American Beer Festival for Best German-style pilsner, 2005.

== See also ==
- California breweries
- Austrian Beer
- Steinkrug
