= 2012–13 NCAA football bowl games =

College football postseason game series

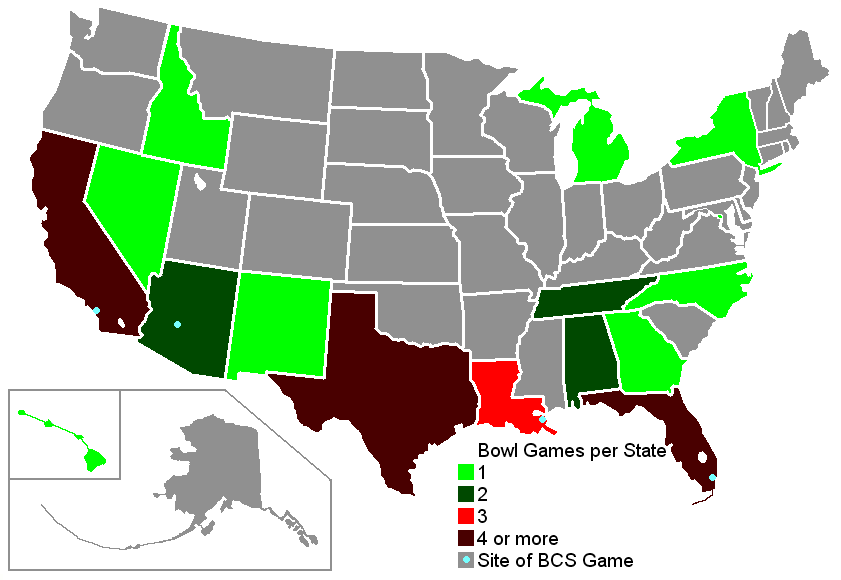
- Bowl sites by state
- Season: 2012
- Regular season: August 30, 2012 – December 8, 2012
- Number of bowls: 35
- All-star games: 4
- Bowl games: December 15, 2012 – February 5, 2013
- National Championship: 2013 BCS National Championship
- Location of Championship: Sun Life Stadium; Miami Gardens, FL
- Champions: Alabama Crimson Tide
- Bowl Challenge Cup winner: Conference USA
Bowl record by conference
Conference	Bowls	Record	Number of teams in final AP poll
Big 12	9	4–5 (0.444)	3
SEC	9	6–3 (0.667)	7
Pac-12	8	4–4 (0.500)	3
Big Ten	7	2–5 (0.286)	4
MAC	7	2–5 (0.286)	2
ACC	6	4–2 (0.667)	2
Big East	5	3–2 (0.600)	1
Conference USA	5	4–1 (0.800)	0
Mountain West	5	1–4 (0.200)	0
Sun Belt	4	2–2 (0.500)	0
Independents	3	1–2 (0.333)	1
WAC	2	2–0 (1.000)	2

The 2012–13 NCAA football bowl games were a series of college football bowl games. They concluded the 2012 NCAA Division I FBS football season, and included 35 team-competitive games and four all-star games. The games began on Saturday, December 15, 2012, and, aside from the all-star games, concluded with the 2013 BCS National Championship Game in Miami Gardens, Florida that was played on January 7, 2013.

The total of 35 team-competitive bowls was unchanged from the previous year. While bowl games had been the purview of only the very best teams for nearly a century, this was the seventh consecutive year that teams with non-winning seasons participated in bowl games. To fill the 70 available team-competitive bowl slots, a total of 13 teams (19% of all participants) with non-winning seasons participated in bowl games—12 had a .500 (6-6) season and, for the second consecutive year, a team with a sub-.500 (6-7) season was invited to a bowl game.

== Selection of the teams ==
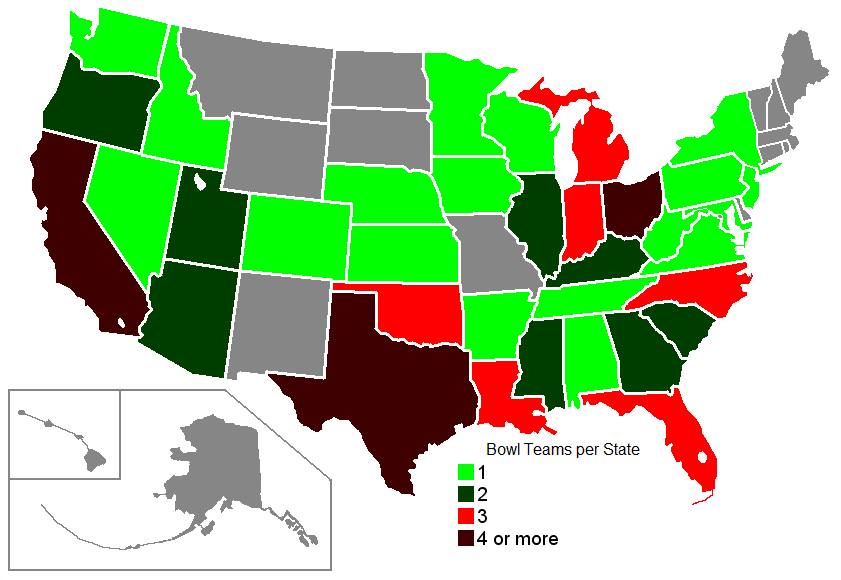
Number of bowl teams per state.

=== Bowl-eligibility contingency plan ===
As per 2010 and 2011, initial bowl eligibility would go to teams with no lower than a non-losing record (6-6) for the season. On August 2, 2012, the NCAA Division I Board of Directors approved a significant change to the process to determine bowl eligible teams, going so far as to potentially allow 5-7 teams to go to a bowl, in case there were not enough regular bowl-eligible teams to fill every game. If a bowl has one or more conferences/teams unable to meet their contractual commitments and there are no available bowl-eligible teams, the open spots can be filled – by the particular bowl's sponsoring agencies – as follows:

1. Teams finishing 6–6 with one win against a team from the lower Football Championship Subdivision (FCS), regardless of whether that FCS school meets NCAA scholarship requirements. Until now, an FCS win counted only if that opponent met the scholarship requirements—specifically, that school had to award at least 90% of the FCS maximum of 63 scholarship equivalents over a two-year period. In the 2012 season, programs in four FCS conferences cannot meet the 90% requirement (56.7 equivalents)—the Ivy League, which prohibits all athletic scholarships; the Patriot League and Pioneer Football League, which do not currently award football scholarships; and the Northeast Conference, which limits football scholarships to 38 equivalents.
2. 6-6 teams with two wins over FCS schools.
3. Teams that finish 6–7 with loss number seven in their conference championship game.
4. 6-7 teams that normally play a 13-team schedule, such as Hawaii's home opponents. Although Hawaii normally plays a 13-game schedule, it only played 12 games this season.
5. FCS teams who are in the final year of the two-year FBS transition process, if they have at least a 6–6 record.
6. Finally, 5-7 teams that have a top-5 Academic Progress Rate (APR) score. This was later adjusted to allow other 5-7 teams to be selected thereafter—in order of their APR.

This process was created as a number of schools were banned, self-banned or potentially banned from the 2012 bowls, risking unfilled bowl games under the previous process: Ohio State, Penn State, North Carolina and UCF received bowl bans for this season (UCF's appeal hearing has been delayed until 2013, keeping them eligible this season), while there were unresolved NCAA cases examining Oregon and Miami (Miami has self-imposed a bowl ban for both 2011 and 2012).

Note: Georgia Tech lost in the ACC Championship Game to go 6–7 on the season. Georgia Tech applied for a waiver, distinct from the bowl-eligibility contingency plan, stating that they were forced to play the ACC Championship Game because higher finishing Miami self-imposed a postseason ban in a bid to lessen possible NCAA sanctions resulting from their school's 2011 athletics scandal. (North Carolina, which also finished ahead of Georgia Tech, was ineligible to participate due to NCAA sanctions.) The NCAA granted Georgia Tech the waiver and direct, non-contingent, eligibility for bowl play.

=== Bowl Championship Series ===
Ten teams were selected for the Bowl Championship Series:

Conference champions

- Alabama qualified directly for the 2013 BCS National Championship Game as BCS #2. Alabama also won the SEC Championship Game.
- Stanford qualified by winning the Pac-12 Championship Game and played in the 2013 Rose Bowl, which agreed to host the Pac-12 champion.
- Florida State qualified by winning the ACC Championship Game and played in the 2013 Orange Bowl, which agreed to host the ACC champion.
- Wisconsin qualified by winning the Big Ten Championship Game and played in the 2013 Rose Bowl, which agreed to host the Big Ten champion.
- Kansas State qualified by winning Big 12's spot in a tie-breaker over Oklahoma, having defeated them in the head-to-head matchup, and played in the 2013 Fiesta Bowl, which hosts the Big 12 champion.
- Louisville qualified by winning the Big East Conference. The Big East champion rotated among bowls; this time it played in the 2013 Sugar Bowl.

At-Large Bids

- Notre Dame, an independent, qualified as BCS #1 and played in the 2013 BCS National Championship Game.
- Florida, a member of the SEC, qualified as BCS #3 and was selected to play in the 2013 Sugar Bowl.
- Oregon, a member of the Pac-12, was eligible for an at-large selection as BCS #4 and was selected to play in the 2013 Fiesta Bowl.
- Northern Illinois, the winner of the MAC championship game, qualified by being the highest-ranked (BCS #15) member of a non-AQ conference to finish in the Top 16 of the BCS and higher ranked than at least one AQ-conference champion (in this case, both Louisville and Wisconsin). NIU was selected to play in the 2013 Orange Bowl.

== Bowl eligibility ==
=== Eligible ===
- ACC (6) : Clemson (ACC Atlantic Division Co-Champions), Florida State (ACC Atlantic Division Champions, ACC Champions), Duke, NC State, Virginia Tech, Georgia Tech (ACC Coastal Division Co-Champions)
- Big East (5) : Louisville (Big East Co-Champions), Rutgers (Big East Co-Champions), Cincinnati (Big East Co-Champions), Syracuse (Big East Co-Champions), Pittsburgh
- Big Ten (7) : Northwestern, Wisconsin (Big Ten Champions), Nebraska (Big Ten Legends Division Champions), Michigan, Minnesota, Purdue, Michigan State
- Big 12 (9) : Kansas State (Big 12 Co-Champions), Texas Tech, Texas, Oklahoma (Big 12 Co-Champions), TCU, Oklahoma State, Iowa State, West Virginia, Baylor
- Conference USA (5) : Tulsa (Conference USA Champions), UCF (C-USA East Division Champions), East Carolina, SMU, Rice
- Independents (3) : BYU, Notre Dame, Navy
- MAC (7) : NIU (MAC Champions), Ohio, Toledo, Kent State (MAC East Champions), Ball State, Bowling Green, Central Michigan
- Mountain West (5) : Nevada, Boise State (Mountain West Conference (Co-Champions)), Fresno State (Mountain West Conference (Co-Champions)), San Diego State (Mountain West Conference (Co-Champions)), Air Force
- Pac-12 (8) : Stanford (Pac-12 Champion), Oregon (Pac-12 North Division Co-Champions), USC, Oregon State, UCLA (Pac-12 South Division Champions), Arizona, Washington, Arizona State
- SEC (9) : South Carolina, Alabama (SEC Champions), Florida (SEC East Division Co-Champions), LSU, Mississippi State, Georgia (SEC East Division Co-Champions, East Division representative in SEC Championship Game), Texas A&M, Vanderbilt, Ole Miss
- Sun Belt (5) : Western Kentucky, Louisiana–Monroe, Arkansas State (Sun Belt Conference Champions), Louisiana–Lafayette, Middle Tennessee
- WAC (3) : Utah State (WAC Champions), San Jose State, Louisiana Tech

Number of bowl berths available: 70
Number of teams assured of bowl eligibility: 72 (71 plus 6–7 Georgia Tech, per NCAA waiver)

Bowl eligible teams that did not receive a bid: 2

- WAC: Louisiana Tech (9-3)
- Sun Belt: Middle Tennessee (8-4)

Note: On Friday, November 30, Louisiana Tech was invited to play in the Independence Bowl but asked for more time as they were in negotiations with the Liberty Bowl and Heart of Dallas Bowl. Louisiana Tech athletic director Bruce Van De Velde and WAC commissioner Jeff Hurd both claimed that on Saturday, December 1, the Liberty Bowl executive director Steve Ehrhart guaranteed the Bulldogs a bowl invite. After the Independence Bowl's deadline for Louisiana Tech to accept their invitation passed, the Independence Bowl selected the MAC's Ohio (8-4) instead. On Sunday, December 2, the Liberty Bowl extended their remaining bid to Iowa State (6-6) instead of Louisiana Tech (9-3). The Bulldogs did not end up playing in any bowl game despite boasting the nation's top scoring offense. Other media reports indicated that the Liberty Bowl and Sun Belt were discussing placing the winner of Arkansas State and Middle Tennessee State in the Memphis-based Liberty bowl.

=== Teams unable to become bowl-eligible ===
- ACC (6): North Carolina (via NCAA sanctions), Miami (FL) (via self-imposed bowl ban), Boston College, Virginia, Maryland, Wake Forest
- Big East (3): Temple, South Florida, Connecticut
- Big Ten (5): Ohio State (via NCAA sanctions), Penn State (via NCAA sanctions), Illinois, Iowa, Indiana
- Big 12 (1): Kansas
- C-USA: (7): Southern Miss, Marshall, Memphis, UAB, UTEP, Tulane, Houston
- Independents (1): Army
- MAC (6): Akron, UMass, Eastern Michigan, Buffalo, Western Michigan, Miami-Ohio
- Mountain West (5): UNLV, Wyoming, Colorado State, Hawaii, New Mexico
- Pac-12 (4): Colorado, California, Washington State, Utah
- SEC (5): Kentucky, Auburn, Arkansas, Tennessee, Missouri
- Sun Belt (5): FIU, Florida Atlantic, South Alabama, North Texas, Troy
- WAC (4): Idaho, New Mexico State, Texas State, UTSA (ineligible as first-year transitional FBS school)

Number of teams assured of bowl ineligibility: 52 (since the above noted bowl-eligibility contingency plan was not required)

== New bowl sponsors ==
The Champs Sports Bowl, in Orlando, is now the Russell Athletic Bowl. The Insight Bowl, held in Tempe, Arizona, is now the Buffalo Wild Wings Bowl. The TicketCity Bowl has been renamed the Heart of Dallas Bowl; its new sponsor is Plains Capital Bank.

== Moratorium on new bowl games ==
The NCAA has placed a three-year moratorium, starting with the 2011-12 bowl season, on any new bowl games. This follows the addition of two new games (Pinstripe Bowl, TicketCity Bowl) for the 2010-11 bowl season, bringing the total number of bowl games to 35. The expansion to 70 teams required to fill these 35 bowl games has challenged the ability to actually find enough teams with winning (7-5 or better) records to fill bowl slots. Teams with non-winning (6-6) and losing (6-7) records have participated in bowl games since the expansion to 35 games. As discussed above (Bowl-eligibility contingency plan), the NCAA was forced to anticipate a need to allow teams with even worse (5-7) losing records to fill bowl selection slots in 2012–13.

== Schedule ==
The bowl game schedule was released July 10, 2012. On December 2, 2012, the final BCS standings were announced and teams were officially selected for the various bowl games.

NOTES:
*All times are EST (UTC −5).
*Rankings are from final BCS Poll.

=== Non-BCS games ===
Date	Game	Site	Television	Teams	Affiliations	Results
Dec. 15	New Mexico Bowl	University Stadium; University of New Mexico; Albuquerque, NM; 1:00 pm	ESPN	Nevada Wolf Pack (7-5); Arizona Wildcats (7-5)	MWC; Pac-12	Nevada 48; Arizona 49
Dec. 15	Famous Idaho Potato Bowl	Bronco Stadium; Boise State University; Boise, ID; 4:30 pm	ESPN	Toledo Rockets (9-3) #22 Utah State Aggies (10-2)	MAC; WAC	Toledo 15; Utah State 41
Dec. 20	Poinsettia Bowl	Qualcomm Stadium; San Diego, CA; 8:00 pm	ESPN	San Diego State Aztecs (9-3); BYU Cougars (7-5)	MWC; Independent	San Diego State 6 BYU 23
Dec. 21	Beef 'O' Brady's Bowl	Tropicana Field; St. Petersburg, FL; 7:30 pm	ESPN	Ball State Cardinals (9-3); UCF Knights (9-4)	MAC; C-USA	Ball State 17; UCF 38
Dec. 22	New Orleans Bowl	Mercedes-Benz Superdome; New Orleans, LA; Noon	ESPN	East Carolina Pirates (8-4); Louisiana–Lafayette Ragin' Cajuns (8-4)	C-USA; Sun Belt	East Carolina 34; Louisiana-Lafayette 43
Dec. 22	Maaco Bowl Las Vegas	Sam Boyd Stadium; University of Nevada, Las Vegas; Whitney, NV; 3:30 pm	ESPN	#19 Boise State Broncos (10-2); Washington Huskies (7-5)	MWC; Pac-12	Boise State 28; Washington 26
Dec. 24	Hawaii Bowl	Aloha Stadium; Honolulu, HI; 8:00 pm	ESPN	SMU Mustangs (6-6); Fresno State Bulldogs (9-3)	C-USA; MWC	SMU 43; Fresno State 10
Dec. 26	Little Caesars Pizza Bowl	Ford Field; Detroit, MI; 7:30 pm	ESPN	Western Kentucky Hilltoppers (7-5); Central Michigan Chippewas (6-6)	Sun Belt; MAC	WKU 21; Central Michigan 24
Dec. 27	Military Bowl	RFK Stadium; Washington, DC; 3:00 pm	ESPN	#24 San Jose State Spartans (10-2); Bowling Green Falcons (8-4)	WAC; MAC	San Jose State 29; Bowling Green 20
Dec. 27	Belk Bowl	Bank of America Stadium; Charlotte, NC; 6:30 pm	ESPN	Duke Blue Devils (6-6); Cincinnati Bearcats (9-3)	ACC; Big East	Duke 34; Cincinnati 48
Dec. 27	Holiday Bowl	Qualcomm Stadium; San Diego, CA; 9:45 pm	ESPN	Baylor Bears (7-5) #17 UCLA Bruins (9-4)	Big 12; Pac-12	Baylor 49; UCLA 26
Dec. 28	Independence Bowl	Independence Stadium; Shreveport, LA; 2:00 pm	ESPN	Ohio Bobcats (8-4); Louisiana-Monroe Warhawks (8-4)	MAC; Sun Belt	Ohio 45; Louisiana-Monroe 14
Dec. 28	Russell Athletic Bowl	Citrus Bowl; Orlando, FL; 5:30 pm	ESPN	Virginia Tech Hokies (6-6); Rutgers Scarlet Knights (9-3)	ACC; Big East	Virginia Tech 13; Rutgers 10 (OT)
Dec. 28	Meineke Car Care Bowl of Texas	Reliant Stadium; Houston, TX; 9:00 pm	ESPN	Minnesota Golden Gophers (6-6); Texas Tech Red Raiders (7-5)	Big Ten; Big 12	Minnesota 31; Texas Tech 34
Dec. 29	Armed Forces Bowl	Amon G. Carter Stadium; Fort Worth, TX; 11:45 am	ESPN	Rice Owls (6-6); Air Force Falcons (6-6)	C-USA; MWC	Rice 33; Air Force 14
Dec. 29	Pinstripe Bowl	Yankee Stadium; Bronx, NY; 3:15 pm	ESPN	Syracuse Orange (7-5); West Virginia Mountaineers (7-5)	Big East; Big 12	Syracuse 38; West Virginia 14
Dec. 29	Kraft Fight Hunger Bowl	AT&T Park; San Francisco, CA; 4:00 pm	ESPN2	Arizona State Sun Devils (7-5); Navy Midshipmen (8-4)	Pac-12; Independent	Arizona State 62; Navy 28
Dec. 29	Alamo Bowl	Alamodome; San Antonio, TX; 6:45 pm	ESPN	#23 Texas Longhorns (8-4) #13 Oregon State Beavers (9-3)	Big 12; Pac-12	Texas 31; Oregon State 27
Dec. 29	Buffalo Wild Wings Bowl	Sun Devil Stadium; Arizona State University; Tempe, AZ; 10:15 pm	ESPN	Michigan State Spartans (6-6); TCU Horned Frogs (7-5)	Big Ten; Big 12	Michigan State 17; TCU 16
Dec. 31	Music City Bowl	LP Field; Nashville, TN; 12:05 pm	ESPN	Vanderbilt Commodores (8-4); NC State Wolfpack (7-5)	SEC; ACC	Vanderbilt 38; NC State 24
Dec. 31	Sun Bowl	Sun Bowl Stadium; University of Texas El Paso; El Paso, TX; 2:00 pm	CBS	Georgia Tech Yellow Jackets (6-7); USC Trojans (7-5)	ACC; Pac-12	Georgia Tech 21; USC 7
Dec. 31	Liberty Bowl	Liberty Bowl Memorial Stadium; Memphis, TN; 3:30 pm	ESPN	Iowa State Cyclones (6-6); Tulsa Golden Hurricane (10-3)	Big 12; C-USA	Iowa State 17; Tulsa 31
Dec. 31	Chick-fil-A Bowl	Georgia Dome; Atlanta, GA; 7:30 pm	ESPN	#14 Clemson Tigers (10-2) #8 LSU Tigers (10-2)	ACC; SEC	Clemson 25; LSU 24
Jan. 1	Gator Bowl	EverBank Field; Jacksonville, FL; Noon	ESPN2	Mississippi State Bulldogs (8-4) #20 Northwestern Wildcats (9-3)	SEC; Big Ten	Mississippi State 20; Northwestern 34
Jan. 1	Heart of Dallas Bowl	Cotton Bowl; Dallas, TX; Noon	ESPNU	Purdue Boilermakers (6-6); Oklahoma State Cowboys (7-5)	Big Ten; Big 12	Purdue 14; Oklahoma State 58
Jan. 1	Capital One Bowl	Citrus Bowl; Orlando, FL; 1:00 pm	ABC	#7 Georgia Bulldogs (11-2) #16 Nebraska Cornhuskers (10-3)	SEC; Big Ten	Georgia 45; Nebraska 31
Jan. 1	Outback Bowl	Raymond James Stadium; Tampa, FL; 1:00 pm	ESPN	#10 South Carolina Gamecocks (10-2) #18 Michigan Wolverines (8-4)	SEC; Big Ten	South Carolina 33; Michigan 28
Jan. 4	Cotton Bowl Classic	Cowboys Stadium; Arlington, TX; 8:00 pm	FOX	#9 Texas A&M Aggies (10-2) #11 Oklahoma Sooners (10-2)	SEC; Big 12	Texas A&M 41; Oklahoma 13
Jan. 5	BBVA Compass Bowl	Legion Field; Birmingham, AL; 1:00 pm	ESPN	Pittsburgh Panthers (6-6); Ole Miss Rebels (6-6)	Big East; SEC	Pittsburgh 17; Ole Miss 38
Jan. 6	GoDaddy.com Bowl	Ladd–Peebles Stadium; Mobile, AL; 9:00 pm	ESPN	#25 Kent State Golden Flashes (11-2); Arkansas State Red Wolves (9-3)	MAC; Sun Belt	Kent State 13; Arkansas State 17

=== 2013 Bowl Championship Series schedule ===
Date	Game	Site	Television	Teams	Affiliations	Results
Jan. 1	Rose Bowl	Rose Bowl; Pasadena, CA; 5:00 pm	ESPN	#6 Stanford Cardinal (11–2); Wisconsin Badgers (8–5)	Pac-12; Big Ten	Stanford 20; Wisconsin 14
Jan. 1	Orange Bowl	Sun Life Stadium; Miami Gardens, FL; 8:30 pm	ESPN	#15 Northern Illinois Huskies (12–1) #12 Florida State Seminoles (11–2)	MAC; ACC	Northern Illinois 10; Florida State 31
Jan. 2	Sugar Bowl	Mercedes-Benz Superdome; New Orleans, LA; 8:30 pm	ESPN	#21 Louisville Cardinals (10-2) #3 Florida Gators (11-1)	Big East; SEC	Louisville 33; Florida 23
Jan. 3	Fiesta Bowl	University of Phoenix Stadium; Glendale, AZ; 8:30 pm	ESPN	#5 Kansas State Wildcats (11-1) #4 Oregon Ducks (11-1)	Big 12; Pac-12	Kansas State 17; Oregon 35
Jan. 7	BCS National Championship Game	Sun Life Stadium; Miami Gardens, FL; 8:30 pm	ESPN	#1 Notre Dame Fighting Irish (12–0) #2 Alabama Crimson Tide (12–1)	Independent; SEC	Notre Dame 14; Alabama 42

=== Post-BCS all-star games ===
Date	Game	Site	Television	Participants	Results
Jan. 19	East–West Shrine Game	Tropicana Field; St. Petersburg, FL; 4:00 pm	NFL Network	East Team vs. West Team	West 28; East 13
Jan. 19	NFLPA Collegiate Bowl	StubHub Center; Carson, CA; 6:00 pm	NBC Sports Network	National Team vs. American Team	National 20; American 14
Jan. 26	Senior Bowl	Ladd–Peebles Stadium; Mobile, AL; 4:00 pm	NFL Network	North Team vs. South Team	South 21; North 16
Feb. 2	Texas vs The Nation	Eagle Stadium; Allen, TX	NFL Network	Texas Team vs. The Nation Team	The Nation 24; Texas 13
