= 2013 NCAA football bowl games =

In college football, 2013 NCAA football bowl games may refer to:

- 2012–13 NCAA football bowl games, for games played in January 2013 as part of the 2012 season
- 2013–14 NCAA football bowl games, for games played in December 2013 as part of the 2013 season
