= 2012 NCAA football bowl games =

In college football, 2012 NCAA football bowl games may refer to:

- 2011–12 NCAA football bowl games, for games played in January 2012 as part of the 2011 season.
- 2012–13 NCAA football bowl games, for games played in December 2012 as part of the 2012 season.
