= 2012 UTSA Roadrunners football team =

American college football season

2012 UTSA Roadrunners football
- Conference: Western Athletic Conference
- Record: 8–4 (3–3 WAC)
- Head coach: Larry Coker (2nd season)
- Offensive coordinator: Kevin Brown (1st season)
- Offensive scheme: Spread
- Defensive coordinator: Neal Neathery (2nd season)
- Base defense: 4–2–5
- Home stadium: Alamodome

2012 Western Athletic Conference football standings
	Conf.			Overall
Team	W		L	W		L
No. 16 Utah State $	6	–	0	11	–	2
No. 21 San Jose State	5	–	1	11	–	2
Louisiana Tech	4	–	2	9	–	3
UTSA *	3	–	3	8	–	4
Texas State *	2	–	4	4	–	8
Idaho	1	–	5	1	–	11
New Mexico State	0	–	6	1	–	11
$ – Conference champion; * Texas State and UTSA were not eligible for conference title or bowl games as part of their transition to the FBS.; Rankings from AP Poll

The 2012 UTSA Roadrunners football team represented the University of Texas at San Antonio in the 2012 NCAA Division I FBS football season. This was the second season for football at UTSA and their first as members of the Western Athletic Conference. Larry Coker returned as the team's coach for a second season. The team played its home games at the Alamodome. This was the second of a two-year FCS to FBS transition period for UTSA, so they were not bowl-eligible. It was UTSA's only season in the WAC, as they joined Conference USA on July 1, 2013. They finished the season 8–4, 3–3 in WAC play to finish in fourth place.

== Before the season ==
=== Previous season ===
In 2011, the Roadrunners represented UTSA in its first year of play in a 4–6 season. UTSA started the season with a 2–2 record in the first month of competition with both wins combining for a 75-point advantage and a 3-point loss, with its only decisive loss against ranked FCS Southern Utah. After beating Bacone 54-7, the Runners fell into a three-game slump including eventual undefeated championship contender Sam Houston State and double-overtime loss to fellow FCS move-up South Alabama. UTSA ended its first year with two more wins and yet another 3-point loss.

UTSA ended their first year with a losing record, but outplayed their opponents on the statbook due to lopsided wins and multiple close losses.

=== Recruiting ===
23 recruits signed letters of intent to UTSA for the 2012 season. Another three players decided to walk-on, bringing the recruiting class to a total of 26. Robert Singletary decided to transfer from Baylor to UTSA on June 8. He will sit out the 2012 season as required by NCAA transfer rules, but he brings the class total to 27.

College recruiting information (2012)
Name	Hometown	School	Height	Weight	40^{‡}	Commit date
Tucker Carter; QB	Athens, TX	Trinity Valley CC	6 ft 3 in (1.91 m)	215 lb (98 kg)		Dec 22, 2011
Tucker Carter; QB	Recruit ratings: Scout: Rivals: (JC)					
Zach Conque; QB	Little Rock, AR	Catholic	6 ft 5 in (1.96 m)	215 lb (98 kg)	4.74	Jun 15, 2011
Zach Conque; QB	Recruit ratings: Scout: Rivals: (75)					
Treston Coleman; RB	Frankston, TX	Frankston	5 ft 11 in (1.80 m)	215 lb (98 kg)	4.65	Jan 23, 2012
Treston Coleman; RB	Recruit ratings: Scout: Rivals: (45)					
Brian Vaughn; RB	Fort Worth, TX	All Saints	5 ft 9 in (1.75 m)	180 lb (82 kg)	4.39	Feb 1, 2012
Brian Vaughn; RB	Recruit ratings: Scout: Rivals: (45)					
Marcus Wright; RB	San Antonio, TX	Reagan; Georgia Tech	5 ft 7 in (1.70 m)	200 lb (91 kg)		Feb 1, 2012
Marcus Wright; RB	Recruit ratings: Scout: Rivals: (TR)					
Rileigh Davis; WR	San Angelo, TX	San Angelo Central	5 ft 11 in (1.80 m)	150 lb (68 kg)	4.5	Walk-on
Rileigh Davis; WR	Recruit ratings: Scout: Rivals: (NR)					
Jordan Grey; TE	Fort Worth, TX	Trimble Technical	6 ft 4 in (1.93 m)	250 lb (110 kg)		Feb 1, 2012
Jordan Grey; TE	Recruit ratings: Scout: Rivals: (LQ)					
Trevor Stevens; TE	Friendswood, TX	Friendswood	6 ft 4 in (1.93 m)	250 lb (110 kg)		Jan 23, 2012
Trevor Stevens; TE	Recruit ratings: Scout: Rivals: (75)					
Armando Alverez; OL	Brenham, TX	Blinn CC	6 ft 3 in (1.91 m)	300 lb (140 kg)	5.15	Jan 23, 2012
Armando Alverez; OL	Recruit ratings: Scout: Rivals: (JC)					
William Cavanaugh; OL	New Braunfels, TX	Canyon	6 ft 2 in (1.88 m)	285 lb (129 kg)	5.24	Jan 23, 2012
William Cavanaugh; OL	Recruit ratings: Scout: Rivals: (45)					
Cody Cole; OL	Fort Myers, FL	Bishop Verot	6 ft 4 in (1.93 m)	275 lb (125 kg)	5.2	Feb 1, 2012
Cody Cole; OL	Recruit ratings: Scout: Rivals: (45)					
Zach Hester; OL	Houston, TX	Aldine	6 ft 4 in (1.93 m)	305 lb (138 kg)	5.0	Jan 23, 2012
Zach Hester; OL	Recruit ratings: Scout: Rivals: (45)					
Mason Russell; OL	Stockton, CA	San Joaquin Delta	6 ft 6 in (1.98 m)	290 lb (130 kg)		Feb 1, 2012
Mason Russell; OL	Recruit ratings: Scout: Rivals: (JC)					
Alex Delgado; OL	Boerne, TX	Boerne	6 ft 6 in (1.98 m)	310 lb (140 kg)		Walk-on
Alex Delgado; OL	Recruit ratings: Scout: Rivals: (NR)					
Brendon Brinkmann; DE	League City, TX	Clear Springs	6 ft 6 in (1.98 m)	250 lb (110 kg)	4.66	Feb 1, 2012
Brendon Brinkmann; DE	Recruit ratings: Scout: Rivals: (45)					
Skylar Nelson; DE	San Antonio, TX	Alamo Heights	6 ft 3 in (1.91 m)	230 lb (100 kg)	4.7	Jan 31, 2012
Skylar Nelson; DE	Recruit ratings: Scout: Rivals: (69)					
Dan Winter; DE	Cupertino, CA	De Anza	6 ft 4 in (1.93 m)	250 lb (110 kg)		Jan 29, 2012
Dan Winter; DE	Recruit ratings: Scout: Rivals: (JC)					
Brandon Guerrero; LB	Fullerton, CA	Fullerton	6 ft 3 in (1.91 m)	235 lb (107 kg)	4.75	Dec 21, 2011
Brandon Guerrero; LB	Recruit ratings: Scout: Rivals: (JC)					
Charles Wort; LB	New Braunfels, TX	New Braunfels	6 ft 0 in (1.83 m)	195 lb (88 kg)	4.45	Jan 17, 2012
Charles Wort; LB	Recruit ratings: Scout: Rivals: (75)					
Dalton Miller; LB	San Antonio, TX	Earl Warren	6 ft 0 in (1.83 m)	200 lb (91 kg)	4.7	Walk-on
Dalton Miller; LB	Recruit ratings: Scout: Rivals: (NR)					
Cody Berry; DB	Woodland Hills, CA	Pierce CC	6 ft 1 in (1.85 m)	215 lb (98 kg)	4.5	Dec 21, 2011
Cody Berry; DB	Recruit ratings: Scout: Rivals: (JC)					
Jalen James; DB	Lake Charles, LA	LaGrange	5 ft 10 in (1.78 m)	175 lb (79 kg)		Feb 1, 2012
Jalen James; DB	Recruit ratings: Scout: Rivals: (45)					
Brian King; DB	Hutchinson, KS	Hutchinson CC	6 ft 2 in (1.88 m)	190 lb (86 kg)	4.45	Dec 21, 2011
Brian King; DB	Recruit ratings: Scout: Rivals: (JC)					
Trey Mohair; DB	Denton, TX	Ryan	5 ft 11 in (1.80 m)	180 lb (82 kg)	4.5	Oct 30, 2011
Trey Mohair; DB	Recruit ratings: Scout: Rivals: (75)					
Maurice Poullard; DB	Brenham, TX	Blinn	5 ft 10 in (1.78 m)	190 lb (86 kg)	4.4	Feb 1, 2012
Maurice Poullard; DB	Recruit ratings: Scout: Rivals: (JC)					
H. B. Rosser; DB	Clarksville, TX	Clarksville	6 ft 0 in (1.83 m)	170 lb (77 kg)	4.5	Jan 31, 2012
H. B. Rosser; DB	Recruit ratings: Scout: Rivals: (72)					
Robert Singletary; LB	Kingwood, TX	Baylor; Kingwood	6 ft 2 in (1.88 m)	235 lb (107 kg)	4.65	Jun 8, 2012
Robert Singletary; LB	Recruit ratings: Scout: Rivals: (TR)					
Overall recruit ranking: Scout: 124 Rivals: 124 ESPN: Not Ranked Top 25
‡ Refers to 40-yard dash; Note: In many cases, Scout, Rivals, 247Sports, On3, and ESPN may conflict in their listings of height, weight and 40 time.; In these cases, the average was taken. ESPN grades are on a 100-point scale.; Sources: "2012 TX San Antonio Football Commitment List". Rivals.; "Scout.com College Football Recruiting Commits: UT San Antonio". Scout.; "2012 Player Commitments – UT San Antonio". ESPN.; "Scout.com Team Recruiting Rankings". Scout.; "2012 Team Ranking". Rivals.com.

=== Football Fiesta Spring Game ===
The second UTSA Spring Game, called the Football Fiesta Spring Game, was held at the Alamodome on April 15, 2012 at 2:00 p.m.. It featured the roster divided up into the white team, which would play offense, and the blue team, composed entirely of defense. Due to the composition of the teams, a different scoring system would be used. The white team received 6-points for a touchdown, 3 points for a field goal, 1 point for an extra point, and 1 point for a first down. The blue team received 6 points for a touchdown, 5 points for a takeaway or a safety, 3 points for a stop (meaning you prevent the other team from scoring), and one point for an extra point. The two squads matched up over 4 12-minute quarters with a 10-minute Halftime.

Football Fiesta Spring Game 2012

Team	1	2	3	4	Total
• White	12	16	13	3	44
Blue	3	9	14	16	42

- Date: April 15
- Location: Alamodome
  San Antonio, TX
- Game start: 2:36 pm CST
- Elapsed time: 1:52
- Game attendance: 4,736
- Game weather: 72 °F (22 °C), Indoors
- Referee: Charlie Werenut

4,736 fans turned out to see what the UTSA team would have in the 2012 season. They weren't to be disappointed. Six UTSA quarterbacks combined to go 31 of 53 passing for 363 yards and 1 touchdown. After a shaky start the defense also was impressive. They would force 3 interceptions in the back-and-forth showdown. With 1 touchdown rushing, 1 touchdown passing and 2 additional field goals, the final would have been 20-0 in favor of the white team in a regular scoring setting. With the unique scoring system UTSA used, the final would be 44-42 thanks to two first downs before the interception on the White team's final offensive series.

Scoring summary

Quarter	Time	Drive			Team	Scoring information	Score	
Quarter	Time	Plays	Yards	TOP	Team	Scoring information	White	Blue
1	7:39	3	75	4:21	White	Evans Okotcha 6-yard touchdown run, Sean Ianno kick good, 3 first downs	10	0
1	1:58	8	25	5:41	Blue	Defensive stop by Brandon Boyd and Brian King, 2 first downs	12	3
2	12:00	5	12	1:58	Blue	Defensive stop by Marlon Smith, 1 first down	13	6
2	5:16	13	57	5:16	White	23-yard field goal by Sean Ianno, 4 first downs	20	6
2	1:57	6	34	4:47	Blue	Defensive stop by Crosby Adams, 1 first down	21	9
2	0:44	8	72	1:13	White	25-yard field goal by Sean Ianno, 3 first downs	27	9
2	0:00	6	41	0:44	Blue	51-yard field goal attempt from Sean Ianno blocked by Steven Kurfehs, 1 first down	28	12
3	6:50	11	75	5:10	White	David Morgan 9-yard touchdown reception from Tucker Carter, Kristian Stern kick good, 4 first downs	39	12
3	5:17	3	3	1:33	Blue	Defensive stop	39	15
3	3:52	3	6	1:25	Blue	Defensive stop by Darrien Starling	39	18
3	1:16	7	25	2:36	Blue	Defensive stop on hurry by Lekenwic Haynes, 2 first downs	41	21
3	1:07	1	0	0:09	Blue	Tucker Carter pass intercepted by Cody Berry	41	26
4	10:34	5	21	2:33	Blue	Tucker Carter pass intercepted by Darrien Starling, 1 first down	42	31
4	7:38	3	6	2:56	Blue	Defensive stop on dropped pass to Mike Wilburn by Travis Menn	42	34
4	5:30	3	5	2:08	Blue	Defensive stop by Brandon Boyd	42	37
4	0:00	7	26	5:30	Blue	Eric Soza pass intercepted by Cody Berry, 2 first downs	44	42
"TOP" = time of possession. For other American football terms, see Glossary of American football.							44	42

== Roster ==
2012 UTSA Roadrunners football team roster
Players
Coaches
Offense

Pos.	#	Name	Class
WR	1	Kam Jones	So
WR	5	Brandon Armstrong	So
QB	6	Tucker Carter	Jr
QB	7	Ryan Polite	Fr
QB	8	Eric Soza	Jr
WR	9	Marcellus Mack	So
RB	11	David Glasco II	So
WR	12	Earon Holmes	So
WR	13	Quincy Kibbett	Jr
QB	14	Travis Menn	So
TE	14	Cole Hubble	So
WR	15	Josiah Monroe	So
WR	16	Kenny Bias	Fr
QB	16	John Simmons	So
WR	17	Sean Hesler	Fr
WR	18	Kenny Harrison	So
QB	19	Cade Laufer	Fr
RB	27	Nate Shaw	So
RB	28	Terrance Wilburn	So
RB	36	Evans Okotcha	Jr
RB	39	Richard Mendoza	Sr
RB	41	CheRod Simpson	Jr
G	51	Payton Rion	So
G	54	Darius Anderson	So
C	55	Nate Leonard	So
C	60	Andy Flores	So
C	62	Jamie Bernal	So
C	63	Will Cavanaugh	Fr
G	65	Michael Roberson	So
OT	68	Cody Harris	So
OT	74	Drew Phillips	So
OT	76	Josh Walker	So
OL	78	Patrick Hoog	Sr
G	79	Scott Inskeep	So
WR	80	Cole Hicks	Jr
TE	81	Demetrius Biaker	So
TE	82	David Morgan	So
WR	83	Mike Wilburn	So
WR	84	Brandon Freeman	So
TE	85	Jeremiah Moeller	Jr
WR	86	Seth Grubb	So
TE	87	Jordan Gray	Fr
WR	88	James Bakke	So
TE	89	Austin Rushing	Fr

Defense

Pos.	#	Name	Class
CB	2	Jeremy Hall	So
CB	4	Crosby Adams	So
S	3	Cody Berry	Jr
CB	11	Malcolm Scott	Fr
S	12	Brain King	So
S	13	Jake Smith	So
S	14	Triston Wade	So
CB	17	Erik Brown	Jr
LB	20	Brandon Guerrero	Jr
CD	21	Toyin Dada	So
S	22	Nic Johnston	So
LB	23	John Walker III	So
CB	24	Darrien Starling	So
S	25	Mauricio Sanchez	So
S	26	Spencer Phillips	So
S	29	Uche Njoku	Jr
S	31	Joseph Lizcano	So
LB	32	Drew Douglas	So
S	33	Miguellino Byrd	So
S	34	Sean Luchnick	Sr
CB	35	Xaviar Archangel	Jr
S	37	Lekenwic Haynes	Sr
DE	40	William Ritter	Jr
CB	42	Godwin Wyche II	So
S	43	Cody Rogers	So
LB	44	Steven Kurfehs	Jr
DE	45	Marlon Smith	Sr
DE	49	Dominique Henderson	So
LB	50	Cole Hubble	So
LB	52	Blake Terry	So
LB	53	Brandon Reeves	Sr
LB	57	Brandon Boyd	So
DT	58	Ferrington Macon	So
DT	61	Richard Burge	So
DT	64	Franky Anaya	Sr
DE	90	Jarron Harris	Jr
DE	91	John Roper	So
DE	96	Jason Neill	So
DT	97	Ashaad Mabry	So
DT	98	Leighton Gilbert	So

Special teams

Pos.	#	Name	Class
P	46	Parker Cundiff	Sr
PK, P	47	Josh Ward	So
DS	59	Jesse Medrano	So
PK, P	92	Sean Ianno	So
PK	95	Kristian Stern	So

Head coach

- Larry Coker

Coordinators/assistant coaches

- Kevin Brown
  Offensive coordinator/quarterbacks
- Perry Eliano
  Safeties
- Polo Gutierrez
  Runningbacks
- Tony Jeffery
  Special teams coordinator/receivers
- Nathaniel Jones
  Cornerbacks
- Jim Marshall
  Offensive linemen
- Neal Neathery
  Defensive coordinator/linebackers
- Charlie Reeve
  Tight ends
- Eric Roark
  Defensive linemen

Legend

- (C) Team captain
- (S) Suspended
- (I) Ineligible
- Injured
- Redshirt

Roster
Last update: April 16, 2012

== Schedule ==
Date	Time	Opponent	Site	TV	Result	Attendance
September 1	1:00 p.m.	at South Alabama*	Ladd–Peebles Stadium; Mobile, AL	ESPN3	W 33–31	17,144
September 8	1:00 p.m.	Texas A&M–Commerce*	Alamodome; San Antonio, TX		W 27–16	30,416
September 15	5:00 p.m.	at Georgia State*	Georgia Dome; Atlanta, GA		W 38–14	11,496
September 22	1:00 p.m.	Northwestern Oklahoma State*	Alamodome; San Antonio, TX		W 56–3	25,742
September 29	7:00 p.m.	at New Mexico State	Aggie Memorial Stadium; Las Cruces, NM	KCWX/Aggie Vision/ESPN3	W 35–14	14,341
October 13	2:30 p.m.	at Rice*	Rice Stadium; Houston, TX	FCS Pacific	L 14–34	28,677
October 20	1:00 p.m.	San Jose State^{†}	Alamodome; San Antonio, TX	ESPN3	L 24–52	30,862
October 27	1:00 p.m.	Utah State	Alamodome; San Antonio, TX	ESPN3	L 17–48	23,519
November 3	3:00 p.m.	at No. 22 Louisiana Tech	Joe Aillet Stadium; Ruston, LA	ESPN+/KCWX	L 27–51	23,645
November 10	1:00 p.m.	McNeese State*	Alamodome; San Antonio, TX		W 31–24	25,784
November 17	4:00 p.m.	at Idaho	Kibbie Dome; Moscow, ID	KCWX	W 34–17	9,030
November 24	1:00 p.m.	Texas State	Alamodome; San Antonio, TX (I-35 Rivalry)		W 38–31	39,032
*Non-conference game; ^{†}Homecoming; Rankings from AP Poll; All times are in Central time

Schedule source:

== Depth chart ==
Defense

S
Mauricio Sanchez
Nic Johnston

FS
Triston Wade
Brian King

WLB	SLB
⋅	⋅
⋅	⋅

SS
Cody Berry
Sean Luchnick

CB
Darrien Starling
Crosby Adams

DE	DT	DT	DE
William Ritter	Ferrington Macon	Richard Burge	Jason Neill
Jarron Harris	Ashaad Mabry	Franky Anaya	Dominique Henderson

CB
Erik Brown
Maurice Poullard

Offense

WR
Brandon Freeman
Earon Holmes

WR
Kenny Harrison
Josiah Monroe

LT	LG	C	RG	RT
Patrick Hoog	Scott Inskeep	Nate Leonard	Cody Harris	Josh Walker
Michael Roberson	Jamie Bernal	William Cavanaugh	Payton Rion	Zach Hester

TE
Jeremiah Moeller
Cole Hubble

WR
Kam Jones
Marcellus Mark

QB
Bart Nelson
Tucker Carter

Key reserves
Brandon Armstrong (TB/KR)
Kenny Bias (WR/KR)
Evans Okotcha (TB)
Ryan Polite (QB)
Terrance Wilburn (HB)

RB
David Glasco II
Nate Shaw

Special teams
PK Kristian Stern
PK Sean Ianno
P Josh Ward
P Parker Cundiff
KR Kenny Harrison
PR Brandon Armstrong
LS Jesse Medrano
H Seth Grubb

== Game summaries ==
=== South Alabama ===
UTSA Roadrunners at South Alabama Jaguars

Team	1	2	3	4	Total
• Roadrunners	14	6	0	13	33
Jaguars	7	7	3	14	31

- Date: September 1
- Location: Ladd–Peebles Stadium
  Mobile, AL
- Game start: 1:00 pm CST
- Elapsed time: 3:38
- Game attendance: 17,144
- Game weather: 88 °F (31 °C), Sunny, winds S at 6mph
- Referee: Tony Backert
- TV announcers (ESPN3): Jonathan Yardley and Cole Cubelic

In the opening game of the season, UTSA played the South Alabama Jaguars. The teams previously met in 2011, when South Alabama won 30–27 in double overtime. This was both teams' first ever game as provisional FBS teams, as well as each other's first FBS opponent.

=== Texas A&M–Commerce ===
Texas A&M–Commerce Lions at UTSA Roadrunners

Team	1	2	3	4	Total
Lions	0	3	6	7	16
• Roadrunners	10	14	3	0	27

- Date: September 8
- Location: Alamodome
  San Antonio, TX
- Game start: 1:05 pm CST
- Elapsed time: 2:55
- Game attendance: 30,416
- Game weather: 72 °F (22 °C), Indoors
- Referee: Clair Gausman

In UTSA's first ever FBS home game, they hosted the D-II Texas A&M–Commerce Lions.

To date, this is the most recent time an FBS team played a Division II team in football.

=== Georgia State ===
UTSA Roadrunners at Georgia State Panthers

Team	1	2	3	4	Total
• Roadrunners	17	7	14	0	38
Panthers	7	0	7	0	14

- Date: September 15
- Location: Georgia Dome
  Atlanta, GA
- Game start: 6:07 pm CST
- Elapsed time: 2:41
- Game attendance: 11,496
- Game weather: 72 °F (22 °C), Indoors
- Referee: Paul Zukis

After UTSA's first home game of the season, they travelled to Atlanta to face the FCS opponent, the Georgia State Panthers. UTSA won the previous meeting between the teams 17–14 in overtime.

=== Northwestern Oklahoma State ===
Northwestern Oklahoma State Rangers at UTSA Roadrunners

Team	1	2	3	4	Total
Rangers	0	3	0	0	3
• Roadrunners	21	21	7	7	56

- Date: September 22
- Location: Alamodome
  San Antonio, TX
- Game start: 1:04 pm CST
- Elapsed time: 2:45
- Game attendance: 25,742
- Game weather: 72 °F (22 °C), Indoors
- Referee: Stacy Hardin

After visiting Georgia, UTSA returned home to face the Northwestern Oklahoma State Rangers. Northwestern Oklahoma State was UTSA's sole NAIA opponent after the NCAA denied the Rangers D-II membership.

To date, this is the most recent time an FBS team played a team not in the FBS or FCS, in part, due to how wins against non-Division I teams do not count as wins towards bowl eligibility.

=== New Mexico State ===
UTSA Roadrunners at New Mexico State Aggies

Team	1	2	3	4	Total
• Roadrunners	7	14	7	7	35
Aggies	7	0	0	7	14

- Date: September 29
- Location: Aggie Memorial Stadium
  Las Cruces, NM
- Game start: 7:00 pm CST
- Elapsed time: 3:02
- Game attendance: 14,341
- Game weather: 78 °F (26 °C), Cloudy, winds SW at 3mph
- Referee: Jim Farmer
- TV announcers (KCWX/Aggie Vision/ESPN3): Glen Cerny and Danny Knee

UTSA began its first WAC schedule facing its first-ever full-FBS opponent, the New Mexico State Aggies.

=== Rice ===
UTSA Roadrunners at Rice Owls

Team	1	2	3	4	Total
Roadrunners	0	3	11	0	14
• Owls	6	7	14	7	34

- Date: October 13
- Location: Rice Stadium
  Houston, TX
- Game start: 2:30 pm CST
- Elapsed time: 3:27
- Game attendance: 28,677
- Game weather: 88 °F (31 °C), Sunny, winds S at 20mph
- Referee: Wayne Winkler
- TV announcers (FCS Pacific): Adam Alexander, Gary Reasons, and Leslie McCaslin

Following its trip to Las Cruces, UTSA played its first non-conference FBS team, the Rice Owls. UTSA visiting Rice marked its progression to playing out of conference home-and-homes against FBS teams, where it will eventually play the majority of their non-conference schedule against AQ conference teams in 2013 and 2014.

=== San Jose State ===
San Jose State Spartans at UTSA Roadrunners

Team	1	2	3	4	Total
• Spartans	28	10	14	0	52
Roadrunners	0	10	7	7	24

- Date: October 20
- Location: Alamodome
  San Antonio, TX
- Game start: 1:04 pm CST
- Elapsed time: 3:06
- Game attendance: 30,862
- Game weather: 72 °F (22 °C), Indoors
- Referee: Robert Cameron
- TV announcers (ESPN3): Jim Barbar and Je'Rod Cherry

After its visit to in-state Houston, UTSA hosted the San Jose State Spartans in its first-ever conference home game.

=== Utah State ===
Utah State State at UTSA Roadrunners

Team	1	2	3	4	Total
• Aggies	7	20	21	0	48
Roadrunners	3	0	7	7	17

- Date: October 27
- Location: Alamodome
  San Antonio, TX
- Game start: 12:05 pm MST
- Elapsed time: 3:07
- Game attendance: 23,519
- Game weather: 72 °F (22 °C), Indoors
- Referee: Clair Gausman
- TV announcers (ESPN3): Jonathan Yardley and Forest Conoly

After hosting the Spartans, UTSA hosted the Utah State Aggies.

=== Louisiana Tech ===
UTSA Roadrunners at Louisiana Tech Bulldogs

Team	1	2	3	4	Total
Roadrunners	14	0	7	6	27
• Bulldogs	14	13	7	17	51

- Date: November 3
- Location: Joe Aillet Stadium
  Ruston, LA
- Game start: 3:05 pm CST
- Elapsed time: 3:20
- Game attendance: 23,645
- Game weather: 81 °F (27 °C), Sunny, winds NE 5mph
- Referee: Stacy Hardin
- TV announcers (ESPN+): Trey Bender and Jay Taylor

Following the Aggies game, UTSA went on the road to face the Louisiana Tech Bulldogs.

=== McNeese State ===
McNeese State Cowboys at UTSA Roadrunners

Team	1	2	3	4	Total
Cowboys	7	3	0	14	24
• Roadrunners	0	7	14	10	31

- Date: November 10
- Location: Alamodome
  San Antonio, TX
- Game start: 4:06 pm CST
- Elapsed time: 3:14
- Game attendance: 25,784
- Game weather: 72 °F (22 °C), Indoors
- Referee: David Alvarez

After visiting Ruston, UTSA hosted its final non-conference team of the season, the FCS McNeese State Cowboys. UTSA has previously played McNeese State, where the Roadrunners lost 21–24.

=== Idaho ===
UTSA Roadrunners at Idaho Vandals

Team	1	2	3	4	Total
• Roadrunners	10	10	0	14	34
Vandals	3	0	14	10	27

- Date: November 17
- Location: Kibbie Dome
  Moscow, ID
- Game start: 3:05 pm CST
- Elapsed time: 3:26
- Game attendance: 9,030
- Game weather: 72 °F (22 °C), Indoors
- Referee: Jim Farmer
- TV announcers (KCWX): Sam Adams, Bill Ames, and Jim Goodman

UTSA traveled to Moscow, Idaho to play the Idaho Vandals in their final road game of the season.

=== Texas State ===
Texas State Bobcats at UTSA Roadrunners

Team	1	2	3	4	Total
Bobcats	7	7	10	7	31
• Roadrunners	17	7	7	7	38

- Date: November 24
- Location: Alamodome
  San Antonio, TX
- Game weather: 72 °F (22 °C), Indoors

In its final game of the year, UTSA hosted the Texas State Bobcats in the I-35 Orange vs. Maroon Rivalry's first ever football game.
