= 2012 Texas State Bobcats football team =

American college football season

2012 Texas State Bobcats football
- Conference: Western Athletic Conference
- Record: 4–8 (2–4 WAC)
- Head coach: Dennis Franchione (4th overall season)
- Co-offensive coordinators: Mike Schultz (2nd season); Jeff Conway (1st season)
- Offensive scheme: Multiple
- Defensive coordinator: Craig Naivar (2nd season)
- Base defense: 4–2–5
- Home stadium: Bobcat Stadium

2012 Western Athletic Conference football standings
	Conf.			Overall
Team	W		L	W		L
No. 16 Utah State $	6	–	0	11	–	2
No. 21 San Jose State	5	–	1	11	–	2
Louisiana Tech	4	–	2	9	–	3
UTSA *	3	–	3	8	–	4
Texas State *	2	–	4	4	–	8
Idaho	1	–	5	1	–	11
New Mexico State	0	–	6	1	–	11
$ – Conference champion; * Texas State and UTSA were not eligible for conference title or bowl games as part of their transition to the FBS.; Rankings from AP Poll

The 2012 Texas State Bobcats football team represented Texas State University–San Marcos in the 2012 NCAA Division I FBS football season. The Bobcats were led by head coach Dennis Franchione, in his fourth overall year, and played their home games at Bobcat Stadium. This was Texas State's only season as members of the Western Athletic Conference. Texas State joined the Sun Belt Conference for all sports in 2013–14. It was the second year of their transition from the FCS to the FBS, so they were not eligible to win the WAC regular season title or participate in a bowl game until 2013. They finished the season 4–8, 2–4 in WAC play, to finish in fifth place.

== Before the season ==
=== Recruiting ===
29 recruits signed on, committed, or transferred to play for the 2012 Texas State roster.

College recruiting information (2012)
Name	Hometown	School	Height	Weight	Commit date
Justin Albritton; RB	Anahuac, TX	Anahuac	5 ft 10 in (1.78 m)	185 lb (84 kg)	Oct 31, 2011
Justin Albritton; RB	Recruit ratings: Scout: Rivals: (76)				
Damani Alexcee; CB	League City, TX	Clear Springs	6 ft 1 in (1.85 m)	168 lb (76 kg)	Aug 15, 2011
Damani Alexcee; CB	Recruit ratings: Scout: Rivals: (68)				
Adrian Bellard; OL	Brenham, TX	Brenham	6 ft 5 in (1.96 m)	295 lb (134 kg)	Feb 5, 2012
Adrian Bellard; OL	Recruit ratings: Scout: Rivals: (79)				
Justin Booth; DE	Dayton, TX	Dayton	6 ft 5 in (1.96 m)	266 lb (121 kg)	Feb 5, 2012
Justin Booth; DE	Recruit ratings: Scout: Rivals: (LQ)				
Duke DeLancellotti; QB	Santa Ana, CA	Santa Ana	6 ft 1 in (1.85 m)	190 lb (86 kg)	Dec 11, 2011
Duke DeLancellotti; QB	Recruit ratings: Scout: Rivals: (JC)				
Thomas Evans; DE	Sacramento, CA	American River	6 ft 4 in (1.93 m)	259 lb (117 kg)	Dec 19, 2011
Thomas Evans; DE	Recruit ratings: Scout: Rivals: (JC)				
Matt Gray; OL	Prattville, AL	Prattville	6 ft 6 in (1.98 m)	300 lb (140 kg)	Dec 19, 2011
Matt Gray; OL	Recruit ratings: Scout: Rivals: (72)				
Darius Hood; DT	Plano, TX	Plano East	6 ft 0 in (1.83 m)	280 lb (130 kg)	Feb 2, 2012
Darius Hood; DT	Recruit ratings: Scout: Rivals: (45)				
Jerrid Jeter-Gilmon; LB	Brenham, TX	Brenham	6 ft 2 in (1.88 m)	205 lb (93 kg)	Aug 4, 2011
Jerrid Jeter-Gilmon; LB	Recruit ratings: Scout: Rivals: (45)				
Hayden Lambert; OL	Aledo, TX	Aledo	6 ft 5 in (1.96 m)	265 lb (120 kg)	Aug 9, 2011
Hayden Lambert; OL	Recruit ratings: Scout: Rivals: (65)				
Robert Lowe; RB	Waxahachie, TX	Waxahachie	5 ft 10 in (1.78 m)	190 lb (86 kg)	Jan 25, 2012
Robert Lowe; RB	Recruit ratings: Scout: Rivals: (45)				
Jaryl Mamea; DE	Hayward, CA	Chabot	6 ft 1 in (1.85 m)	255 lb (116 kg)	Jan 30, 2012
Jaryl Mamea; DE	Recruit ratings: Scout: Rivals: (JC)				
Eric Mathews; QB	Brenham, TX	Blinn	6 ft 1 in (1.85 m)	180 lb (82 kg)	Feb 1, 2012
Eric Mathews; QB	Recruit ratings: Scout: Rivals: (JC)				
David Mayo; LB	Scappoose, OR	Santa Monica	5 ft 10 in (1.78 m)	190 lb (86 kg)	Jan 31, 2012
David Mayo; LB	Recruit ratings: Scout: Rivals: (JC)				
Dallas McClarty; DT	League City, TX	Clear Springs	5 ft 11 in (1.80 m)	280 lb (130 kg)	Jun 17, 2011
Dallas McClarty; DT	Recruit ratings: Scout: Rivals: (74)				
Damion McMiller; LB	Stockton, CA	San Joaquin Delta	6 ft 3 in (1.91 m)	235 lb (107 kg)	Jan 23, 2012
Damion McMiller; LB	Recruit ratings: Scout: Rivals: (JC)				
Ryan Melton; OT	Liberty, TX	Liberty	6 ft 5 in (1.96 m)	265 lb (120 kg)	Aug 15, 2011
Ryan Melton; OT	Recruit ratings: Scout: Rivals: (45)				
Jordan Moore; QB	Houston, TX		6 ft 2 in (1.88 m)	190 lb (86 kg)	Feb 1, 2012
Jordan Moore; QB	Recruit ratings: Scout: Rivals: (TR)				
Fred Nixon; QB	Willis, TX	Willis	6 ft 3 in (1.91 m)	200 lb (91 kg)	Aug 7, 2011
Fred Nixon; QB	Recruit ratings: Scout: Rivals: (74)				
Tyler Potter; OL	Santa Ana, CA	Santa Ana	6 ft 4 in (1.93 m)	295 lb (134 kg)	Dec 19, 2011
Tyler Potter; OL	Recruit ratings: Scout: Rivals: (JC)				
Felix Romero; OL	Cedar Park, TX	Cedar Park	6 ft 3 in (1.91 m)	297 lb (135 kg)	Nov 6, 2011
Felix Romero; OL	Recruit ratings: Scout: Rivals: (77)				
Brandon Smith; WR	Prattville, AL	Prattville	6 ft 2 in (1.88 m)	175 lb (79 kg)	Jan 26, 2012
Brandon Smith; WR	Recruit ratings: Scout: Rivals: (45)				
Stephen Smith; LB	Missouri City, TX	Dulles	6 ft 2 in (1.88 m)	205 lb (93 kg)	Aug 23, 2011
Stephen Smith; LB	Recruit ratings: Scout: Rivals: (68)				
Martel Summers; DB	Leander, TX	Leander	6 ft 1 in (1.85 m)	186 lb (84 kg)	Dec 15, 2011
Martel Summers; DB	Recruit ratings: Scout: Rivals: (75)				
Kamu Taulelei; DT	Fagatogo	Chabot	6 ft 1 in (1.85 m)	265 lb (120 kg)	Feb 1, 2012
Kamu Taulelei; DT	Recruit ratings: Scout: Rivals: (JC)				
Dede Westbrook; WR	Cameron, TX	Cameron Yoe	6 ft 2 in (1.88 m)	220 lb (100 kg)	Nov 8, 2011
Dede Westbrook; WR	Recruit ratings: Scout: Rivals: (77)				
Jeremy Williams; DT	Houston, TX	Blinn	6 ft 1 in (1.85 m)	296 lb (134 kg)	Feb 1, 2012
Jeremy Williams; DT	Recruit ratings: Scout: Rivals: (JC)				
Rodney Woodland; WR	Detroit, MI	Saddleback	5 ft 9 in (1.75 m)	180 lb (82 kg)	Jan 28, 2012
Rodney Woodland; WR	Recruit ratings: Scout: Rivals: (JC)				
Jake Woten; DE	Olathe, KS	Fort Scott CC	6 ft 4 in (1.93 m)	245 lb (111 kg)	Dec 14, 2011
Jake Woten; DE	Recruit ratings: Scout: Rivals: (JC)				
Overall recruit ranking:
Note: In many cases, Scout, Rivals, 247Sports, On3, and ESPN may conflict in their listings of height and weight.; In these cases, the average was taken. ESPN grades are on a 100-point scale.; Sources: "2012 Texas State Commitment List". Rivals.; "Scout.com College Football Recruiting Commits: Texas State". Scout.; "2012 Player Commitments – Texas State". ESPN.; "Scout.com Team Recruiting Rankings". Scout.; "2012 Team Ranking". Rivals.com.

=== Maroon-Gold Spring Game ===
The Maroon-Gold Spring Game was held March 31, 2012 at 2:00 p.m. Unlike other spring games where the first and third team usually combine and face the second and fourth teams, Texas State determined their teams through a Coaches Players Draft held on March 28.

The Gold team was chosen by Thaddeus Watkins, Tyler Arndt, Chase Harper, Darryl Morris, and Joplo Bartu, while the Maroon team was chosen by Adley Eshraghipour, Shaun Rutherford, Marcus Curry, Brian Lilly, Jason McLean, and Isaiah Battle. These 11 players, along with Jordan Norfleet, are expected to comprise the Texas State Leadership Council for the 2012 season and will serve as captains throughout the season. The Maroon team was coached by Craig Naivar, Dennis Darnell, Jeff Conway, Mike Hudson, Dennis Porterfield, Wesley Condra, Jeff McKinley, and Vincent Ibewnike. The Gold team was coached by Mike Schultz, Brad Franchione, Jason Johnson, Rueben Vaughn, Jason Washington, Kyle Tatum, John Reid, Ron Woodard, and Eddie Veyran. Head coach Dennis Franchione would join the Texas State radio play-by-play team of Brant Freeman and Bill Culhane on KTSW for the game so he could evaluate his players from the press box area.

Maroon vs. Gold Spring Game

Team	1	2	3	4	Total
Maroon	0	7	10	0	17
• Gold	3	14	0	9	26

- Date: March 31
- Location: Jim Wacker Field at Bobcat Stadium
  San Marcos, TX
- Game start: 2:00 pm CST
- Elapsed time: 2:00
- Game attendance: N/A
- Game weather: 85 °F (29 °C), Sunny and Clear, winds SSE 14 mph

Scoring summary
1	9:56	Gold	Jason Dann 42-yard field goal	Gold 3-0
2	10:20	Gold	Jafus Gaines 40-yard touchdown pass from Tyler Arndt (Jonathan Velasco kick)	Gold 10-0
2	7:30	Gold	Larry Centers Jr. 13-yard touchdown pass from Jack Rhodes (Jonathan Velasco kick)	Gold 17-0
2	0:14	Maroon	Isaiah Battle 31-yard touchdown pass from Duke Delancellotti (Will Johnson kick)	Gold 17-7
3	6:40	Maroon	Marcus Curry 60-yard touchdown pass from Duke Delancellotti (James McNeil kick)	Gold 17-14
3	0:21	Maroon	Will Johnson 23-yard field goal	Tied 17-17
4	11:48	Gold	Terrance Franks 25-yard rush touchdown (Jonathan Velasco kick no good)	Gold 23-17
4	1:59	Gold	Jason Dann 39-yard field goal	Gold 26-17

It was a hard fought battle between the Maroon and Gold teams. The Gold team got out to an early 17-0 lead with 7:30 left in the first half, thanks to a 40-yard touchdown pass from Tyler Arndt to Jafus Gaines and a 13-yard touchdown pass from Jack Rhoades to Larry Centers, Junior, but the maroon team wouldn't be discouraged. Duke DeLancellotti completed a 31-yard touchdown pass to Marcus Curry with 17 second left in the first half to get the maroon team back in the game. DeLancellotti would make it that much closer in the third quarter with a 60-yard touchdown pass to Marcus Curry, but the gold team would strike two seconds into the fourth quarter with a Terrance Franks 25-yard touchdown run that the Gold team would never relinquish. Arndt ended the day completing 13 of his 19 passes for 218 yards. He also gained 22 yards on five carries. Rhoades completed both of his passes for 50 yards.

The leading receiver for the Gold team was Andy Erickson, who caught five passes for 119 yards. He had the longest reception in the game when he caught a 70-yard throw from Arndt. Gaines also caught three passes for 81 yards and Chandler Coffey caught a 37-yard pass from Rhoades after moving over to the offense this spring.

Franks led the rushing attack for the Gold team with 64 yards on 11 carries.

Freshman quarterback Jordan Moore was the leading rusher for the Maroon team after gaining 46 yards on 13 carries. Curry also gained 30 yards on five carries and caught three passes for 71 yards.

== Schedule ==
Date	Time	Opponent	Site	TV	Result	Attendance
September 1	7:00 pm	at Houston*	Robertson Stadium; Houston, TX	CSS	W 30–13	32,207
September 8	6:00 pm	Texas Tech*	Bobcat Stadium; San Marcos, TX	ESPN3	L 10–58	33,006 (Note: Denotes the largest crowd to watch a football game at Bobcat Stadium (beating a previous record set in 1981, the Bobcats' first season at Bobcat Stadium).)
September 22	6:00 pm	Stephen F. Austin*	Bobcat Stadium; San Marcos, TX		W 41–37	17,188
September 29	1:00 pm	Nevada*	Bobcat Stadium; San Marcos, TX	LHN	L 21–34	14,210
October 6	5:00 pm	at New Mexico*	University Stadium; Albuquerque, NM	ProView Networks	L 14–35	22,135
October 13	6:00 pm	Idaho^{†}	Bobcat Stadium; San Marcos, TX	ALT, ESPN3	W 38–7	16,973
October 27	3:00 pm	at San Jose State	Spartan Stadium; San Jose, CA		L 20–31	7,093
November 3	2:00 pm	at Utah State	Romney Stadium; Logan, UT	KMYU, ESPN3	L 7–38	17,222
November 10	6:00 pm	No. 19 Louisiana Tech	Bobcat Stadium; San Marcos, TX	LHN	L 55–62	17,182
November 17	2:30 pm	at Navy*	Navy–Marine Corps Memorial Stadium; Annapolis, MD	CBSSN	L 10–21	31,004
November 24	1:00 pm	at UTSA	Alamodome; San Antonio, TX (I-35 Rivalry)		L 31–38	39,032
December 1	3:00 pm	New Mexico State	Bobcat Stadium; San Marcos, TX		W 66–28	15,108
*Non-conference game; ^{†}Homecoming; Rankings from AP Poll released prior to the game; All times are in Central time

== Game summaries ==
=== Houston ===
Texas State leads the series 3-1. The last meeting was in 2010, and it was the lone Texas State loss to Houston with a 68-28 loss. The other 3 meetings took place from 1945-1947 when both teams were members of the Lone Star Conference. This will be the third meeting in Houston (1946, 2010) with the two teams split at 1-1 overall in Houston games.

Texas State Bobcats at Houston Cougars

Team	1	2	3	4	Total
• Bobcats	14	13	0	3	30
Cougars	10	0	3	0	13

- Date: September 1
- Location: Robertson Stadium
  Houston, TX
- Game start: 7:07 pm CST
- Elapsed time: 3:03
- Game attendance: 32,207
- Game weather: 81 °F (27 °C), Partly Cloudy and humid, Winds S at 6 mph
- Referee: Clay Martin
- TV announcers (CSS): Matt Stewart, Chuck Oliver, and Rachel Baribeau

Scoring summary
1	10:11	Texas State	Marcus Curry 21-yard touchdown pass from Shawn Rutherford (Will Johnson kick)	Texas State 7-0
1	7:58	Houston	Matt Hogan 50-yard Field Goal	Texas State 7-3
1	7:40	Texas State	Marcus Curry 73-yard touchdown run (Will Johnson kick)	Texas State 14-3
1	3:09	Houston	Larry McDuffy 64-yard touchdown pass from David Piland (Matt Hogan kick)	Texas State 14-10
2	12:45	Texas State	Marcus Cury 2-yard touchdown run (Will Johnson kick)	Texas State 21-10
2	5:39	Texas State	Will Johnson 32-yard Field Goal	Texas State 24-10
2	0:00	Texas State	Will Johnson 45-yard Field Goal	Texas State 27-10
3	6:21	Houston	Matt Hogan 37-yard Field Goal	Texas State 27-13
4	6:32	Texas State	Will Johnson 34-yard Field Goal	Texas State 30-13

=== Texas Tech ===
Texas Tech Red Raiders at Texas State Bobcats

Team	1	2	3	4	Total
• Red Raiders	21	17	17	3	58
Bobcats	0	10	0	0	10

- Date: September 8
- Location: Jim Wacker Field at Bobcat Stadium
  San Marcos, TX
- Game start: 6:04 pm CST
- Elapsed time: 3:11
- Game attendance: 33,006
- Game weather: 89 °F (32 °C), Sunny and clear, winds NNE at 19 mph
- Referee: Scott Novak
- TV announcers (ESPN3): Trey Bender and Jay Taylor

=== Stephen F. Austin ===
Stephen F. Austin Lumberjacks at Texas State Bobcats

Team	1	2	3	4	Total
Lumberjacks	10	7	14	6	37
• Bobcats	17	10	14	0	41

- Date: September 22
- Location: Bobcat Stadium
  San Marcos, TX
- Game start: 6:00 pm CST
- Game attendance: 17,188
- Game weather: 87 °F (31 °C), Sunny, winds ESE at 6mph
- Referee: Jim Farmer
- TV announcers (Txstatebobcats.com): Brent Freeman and Bill Culhane

=== Nevada ===
Nevada Wolf Pack at Texas State Bobcats

Team	1	2	3	4	Total
• Wolf Pack	7	13	14	0	34
Bobcats	7	14	0	0	21

- Date: September 29
- Location: Jim Wacker Field at Bobcat Stadium
  San Marcos, TX
- Game start: 1:06 pm CST
- Elapsed time: 3:13
- Game attendance: 14,210
- Game weather: 75 °F (24 °C), Cloudy w/ Light Rain, winds SSE at 10 mph
- Referee: Stacy Hardin
- TV announcers (LHN): Dave Armstrong and Kelly Stouffer

=== New Mexico ===
Texas State Bobcats at New Mexico Lobos

Team	1	2	3	4	Total
Bobcats	7	7	0	0	14
• Lobos	14	14	7	0	35

- Date: October 6
- Location: University Stadium
  Albuquerque, NM
- Game start: 5:06 pm CST
- Elapsed time: 2:58
- Game attendance: 22,135
- Game weather: 77 °F (25 °C), Partly Cloudy, winds SSW at 10 mph
- Referee: Alan Eck
- TV announcers (ProView Networks): Jeff Siembieda and Kole McKamey

=== Idaho ===
Idaho Vandals at Texas State Bobcats

Team	1	2	3	4	Total
Vandals	0	7	0	0	7
• Bobcats	7	7	10	14	38

- Date: October 13
- Location: Jim Wacker Field at Bobcat Stadium
  San Marcos, TX
- Game start: 6:18 pm CST
- Elapsed time: 3:11
- Game attendance: 16,973
- Game weather: 81 °F (27 °C), Cloudy skies, winds N SSE 9mph
- Referee: Robert Cameron
- TV announcers (Altitude/ESPN3): Bob Akamian and Larry Polowski

=== San Jose State ===
Texas State Bobcats at San Jose State Spartans

Team	1	2	3	4	Total
Bobcats	7	13	0	0	20
• Spartans	3	14	14	0	31

- Date: October 27
- Location: Spartan Stadium
  San Jose, CA
- Game start: 3:07 pm CST
- Elapsed time: 2:53
- Game attendance: 7,093
- Game weather: 72 °F (22 °C), Sunny & Clear, winds NNE 2 mph
- Referee: Stacy Hardin

=== Utah State ===
Texas State Bobcats at Utah State Aggies

Team	1	2	3	4	Total
Bobcats	0	0	7	0	7
• Aggies	14	21	3	0	38

- Date: November 3
- Location: Romney Stadium
  Logan, UT
- Game start: 2:07 pm CST
- Elapsed time: 2:43
- Game attendance: 17,222
- Game weather: 53 °F (12 °C), Sparse Clouds, winds N 5 mph
- Referee: Jim Farmer
- TV announcers (KMYU): Mychal Clanton, Kevin White, and Brooks Hansen

=== Louisiana Tech ===
Louisiana Tech Bulldogs at Texas State Bobcats

Team	1	2	3	4	Total
• Bulldogs	14	27	7	14	62
Bobcats	14	20	7	14	55

- Date: November 10
- Location: Jim Wacker Field at Bobcat Stadium
  San Marcos, TX
- Game start: 6:06 pm CST
- Elapsed time: 4:03
- Game attendance: 17,184
- Game weather: 76 °F (24 °C), Partly Cloudy, winds SSE 21 mph
- Referee: Clair Gausman
- TV announcers (LHN): Dave Armstrong and Ray Bentley

=== Navy ===
Texas State Bobcats at Navy Midshipmen

Team	1	2	3	4	Total
Bobcats	0	0	3	7	10
• Midshipmen	7	0	7	7	21

- Date: November 10
- Location: Navy–Marine Corps Memorial Stadium
  Annapolis, MD
- Game start: 2:34 pm CST
- Elapsed time: 3:29
- Game attendance: 31,004
- Game weather: 50 °F (10 °C), Mostly Sunny, winds NE 9mph
- Referee: Stacy Hardin
- TV announcers (CBSSN): Grant Boone, Todd Christensen, and Sheehan Stanwick Burch

=== UTSA ===
Texas State Bobcats at UTSA Roadrunners

Team	1	2	3	4	Total
Bobcats	0	0	0	0	0
Roadrunners	0	0	0	0	0

- Date: November 24
- Location: Alamodome
  San Antonio, TX
- Game weather: 72 °F (22 °C), Indoors

=== Idaho ===
New Mexico State Aggies at Texas State Bobcats

Team	1	2	Total
Aggies			0
Bobcats			0

- Date: December 1
- Location: Jim Wacker Field at Bobcat Stadium
  San Marcos, TX

== Roster ==
2012 Texas State Bobcats football team roster
Players
Coaches
Offense

Pos.	#	Name	Class
C	72	Charlie Will Tuttle	So
QB	2	Jordan Moore	Fr
QB	8	Duke DeLancellotti	Jr
QB	10	Jack Rhoades	Fr
QB	12	Tyler Arndt	Jr
QB	16	Mac Morse	Fr
QB	17	Shaun Rutherford	Sr
RB	20	Terrance Franks	So
RB	21	Claudio Mayen	Jr
RB	28	Marcus Curry	Sr
RB	30	Chris Nutall	So
RB	33	Dexter Imade	So
RB	37	Tim Gay	Fr
RB	42	Brett Blackburn	So
RB	47	Grant Lovelady	So
TE	41	Prestin Brown	Jr
TE	41	Jacob Klemstein	So
TE	83	Colby Goodwin	Jr
TE	84	Kyle Doll	Jr
TE	87	David Lewis	Jr
TE	88	Chase Harper	Sr
WR	1	Ben Ijah	So
WR	3	Cody Matthews	Jr
WR	6	Isaiah Battle	Jr
WR	7	Michael Gilmore	So
WR	9	Deche Milburn	So
WR	11	Tim Hawkins	Sr
WR	13	Andy Erickson	Jr
WR	19	Preston Willis	Fr
WR	24	Larry Centers	So
WR	80	Jafus Gaines	Fr
WR	82	Elijah Cash	Fr
WR	85	Ryan Garrey	Fr
WR	86	Ed Amerson	Sr
WR	89	Bradley Miller	So
OL	50	Collin Fissell	So
OL	53	Devin Baker	Jr
OL	55	Adley Eshraghipour	Sr
OL	56	Thaddeus Watkins	Sr
OL	58	Tyler Potter	Jr
OL	60	Joey Simone	So
OL	61	Josh Sell	So
OL	63	Lee Conoly	Jr
OL	65	Favian Zamora-Torres	So
OL	66	Matt Freeman	Fr
OL	68	Zach Crawford	Fr
OL	70	Andrew Sims	Jr
OL	74	Stephan Jacobs	Fr
OL	75	Mike Yoder	Jr
OL	78	Jackson Costello	Fr
OL	79	Jeff Clermond	Jr

Defense

Pos.	#	Name	Class
CB	2	Darryl Morris	Sr
CB	3	Kenneth Jones Jr.	Fr
CB	9	Hunter Huewitt	Fr
CB	22	David Mims II	Fr
CB	24	Zach Velliquette	Jr
CB	25	Craig Mager	So
CB	26	Phillip Benning	Jr
CB	29	David Farris	So
DB	5	Justin Albritton	Fr
DB	40	Brixx Hawthorne	So
DE	21	Blake Meuth	So
DB	35	Dean Robertson	Fr
DE	92	Ryan McClain	Fr
DE	95	Jonathan Ward	Sr
DE	96	Justin Booth	Fr
DE	97	Jordan Norfleet	Jr
DL	43	Jamie Clavell-Head	Jr
DL	48	Dillon Dumas	Fr
DL	62	Bryton Johnson	So
DL	71	Deshun Williams	Jr
DL	76	David George	So
DL	90	Jarrett Haywood	Sr
DL	93	Jacob Woten	Jr
DL	98	Kamu Taulelei	Jr
DL	99	Thomas Evans	Jr
DT	64	Samuel Mayes	Fr
DT	94	Darius Hood	Fr
LB	31	Joplo Bartu	Sr
LB	34	Brian Lilly	Sr
LB	41	Derek Morrowt	So
LB	42	Tomas Luna	Jr
LB	44	Joshua 'E Robinson	Fr
LB	47	Austin Kirpes	So
LB	51	Drew Hamilton	So
LB	52	Damon Grant	Sr
LB	57	Keishe Wilcox	Fr
S	1	Weston Card	So
S	7	Jeremy Dickey	So
S	8	Justin Iwuji	Jr
S	10	Aaron Matthews	Sr
S	15	Jason McLean	Sr
S	16	Tyler Chase	So
S	18	Xavier Daniels	Jr
S	20	Chad Moncure	So
S	21	Mario Wiggins	Sr
S	27	Colby Targun	So
S	32	Brett Donaldson	Fr
S	36	Jordan Rose	So
S	37	Tyler Blades	Fr
S	38	Tymajrick Jackson	Fr
S	39	Chandler Coffey	Jr
S, LB	4	Khary Alexcee	So

Special teams

Pos.	#	Name	Class
LS	67	Kevin Long	Jr
K	32	Jonathan Velasco	So
K	38	Will Johnson	So
K	40	James McNeill	So
P, K	48	Jason Dann	So

Head coach

- Dennis Franchione

Coordinators/assistant coaches

- Mike Schultz
  Asst. Head coach/co-offensive coordinator/QB coach
- Jeff Conway
  Co-offensive coordinator/running backs coach/ tight ends coach
- Dennis Darnell
  Offensive line coach
- Jason Johnson
  Wide receivers coach
- Craig Naivar
  Defensive coordinator/safeties coach
- Brad Franchione
  Linebackers coach
- Mike Hudson
  Defensive line coach
- Reuben Vaughn
  Defensive tackles coach
- Jason Washington
  Cornerbacks coach
- Mike Groce
  Director of football operations/ recruiting coordinator
- Blake Cundiff
  Football strength and conditioning coach
- David Gish
  Head Athletic Trainer
- Richard (Dick) Miller
  Football Equipment Manager
- Rawley Farrell
  Offensive graduate assistant coach
- Kyle Tatum
  Defensive graduate assistant coach

Legend

- (C) Team captain
- (S) Suspended
- (I) Ineligible
- Injured
- Redshirt

Roster
