= 2012 New Mexico State Aggies football team =

American college football season

2012 New Mexico State Aggies football
- Conference: Western Athletic Conference
- Record: 1–11 (0–6 WAC)
- Head coach: DeWayne Walker (4th season)
- Offensive coordinator: Jerry McManus (1st season)
- Offensive scheme: Air raid
- Defensive coordinator: David Elson (1st season)
- Base defense: 3–4
- Home stadium: Aggie Memorial Stadium

2012 Western Athletic Conference football standings
	Conf.			Overall
Team	W		L	W		L
No. 16 Utah State $	6	–	0	11	–	2
No. 21 San Jose State	5	–	1	11	–	2
Louisiana Tech	4	–	2	9	–	3
UTSA *	3	–	3	8	–	4
Texas State *	2	–	4	4	–	8
Idaho	1	–	5	1	–	11
New Mexico State	0	–	6	1	–	11
$ – Conference champion; * Texas State and UTSA were not eligible for conference title or bowl games as part of their transition to the FBS.; Rankings from AP Poll

The 2012 New Mexico State Aggies football team represented New Mexico State University as a member of the Western Athletic Conference (WAC) during the 2012 NCAA Division I FBS football season. Led by DeWayne Walker in his fourth and final season as head coach, the Aggies compiled an overall record of 1–11 with a mark of 0–6 in conference play, placing last out of seven teams in the WAC. New Mexico State played home games at Aggie Memorial Stadium in Las Cruces, New Mexico.

2012 was the program's final season as a member of the WAC. With the WAC ceasing to support football in the 2013 season, New Mexico State became an FBS independent in 2013.

== Schedule ==
Date	Time	Opponent	Site	TV	Result	Attendance
August 30	6:00 pm	Sacramento State*	Aggie Memorial Stadium; Las Cruces, NM	AV, ALT, ESPN3	W 49–19	12,118
September 8	5:00 pm	at Ohio*	Peden Stadium; Athens, OH	ESPN3	L 24–51	25,893
September 15	6:00 pm	at UTEP*	Sun Bowl; El Paso, TX (Battle of I-10)		L 28–41	32,933
September 22	6:00 pm	New Mexico*	Aggie Memorial Stadium; Las Cruces, NM (Rio Grande Rivalry)	AV, ALT, ESPN3	L 14–27	25,211
September 29	6:00 pm	UTSA	Aggie Memorial Stadium; Las Cruces, NM	AV, ALT, ESPN3	L 14–35	14,341
October 6	3:00 pm	at Idaho	Kibbie Dome; Moscow, ID	KTRV, ALT	L 18–26	14,755
October 20	1:00 pm	at Utah State	Romney Stadium; Logan, UT	KMYU, ESPN3	L 7–41	17,001
October 27	6:00 pm	Louisiana Tech^{†}	Aggie Memorial Stadium; Las Cruces, NM	AV, ESPN3	L 14–28	12,118
November 3	10:30 am	at Auburn*	Jordan-Hare Stadium; Auburn, AL	CSS, ESPN3	L 7–42	74,676
November 10	1:30 pm	San Jose State	Aggie Memorial Stadium; Las Cruces, NM	AV, ALT, ESPN3	L 7–47	9,121
November 24	1:30 pm	BYU*	Aggie Memorial Stadium; Las Cruces, NM	ESPN3	L 14–50	12,571
December 1	2:00 pm	at Texas State	Bobcat Stadium; San Marcos, TX		L 28–66	15,108
*Non-conference game; ^{†}Homecoming; All times are in Mountain time

== Game summaries ==
=== Sacramento State ===
	1	2	3	4	Total
Hornets	0	10	9	0	19
Aggies	7	21	0	21	49

=== @ Ohio ===
	1	2	3	4	Total
Aggies	7	7	10	0	24
Bobcats	7	14	24	6	51

=== @ UTEP ===
	1	2	3	4	Total
Aggies	0	7	7	14	28
Miners	20	7	7	7	41

=== New Mexico ===
	1	2	3	4	Total
Lobos	3	10	7	7	27
Aggies	0	7	0	7	14

=== UTSA ===
	1	2	3	4	Total
Roadrunners	7	14	7	7	35
Aggies	7	0	0	7	14

=== @ Idaho ===
	1	2	3	4	Total
Aggies	3	7	0	8	18
Vandals	10	10	6	0	26

=== @ Utah State ===
	1	2	3	4	Total
NMSU Aggies	0	0	7	0	7
USU Aggies	14	14	10	3	41

=== Louisiana Tech ===
	1	2	3	4	Total
Bulldogs	7	0	14	7	28
Aggies	0	0	0	14	14

=== @ Auburn ===
	1	2	3	4	Total
Aggies	0	0	0	7	7
Tigers	0	7	21	14	42

=== San Jose State ===
	1	2	3	4	Total
Spartans	17	20	10	0	47
Aggies	0	0	0	7	7

=== BYU ===
	1	2	3	4	Total
Cougars	0	20	10	20	50
Aggies	0	7	7	0	14

=== @ Texas State ===
	1	2	3	4	Total
Aggies	21	7	0	0	28
Bobcats	14	35	3	14	66

This was the final WAC football game in history.
