= 2012 Utah State Aggies football team =

American college football season

2012 Utah State Aggies football

WAC champion Famous Idaho Potato Bowl champion

Famous Idaho Potato Bowl, W 41–15 vs. Toledo
- Conference: Western Athletic Conference

Ranking
- Coaches: No. 17
- AP: No. 16
- Record: 11–2 (6–0 WAC)
- Head coach: Gary Andersen (4th season)
- Offensive coordinator: Matt Wells (1st season)
- Offensive scheme: Spread
- Defensive coordinator: Dave Aranda (1st season)
- Base defense: 3–4
- Home stadium: Romney Stadium

2012 Western Athletic Conference football standings
	Conf.			Overall
Team	W		L	W		L
No. 16 Utah State $	6	–	0	11	–	2
No. 21 San Jose State	5	–	1	11	–	2
Louisiana Tech	4	–	2	9	–	3
UTSA *	3	–	3	8	–	4
Texas State *	2	–	4	4	–	8
Idaho	1	–	5	1	–	11
New Mexico State	0	–	6	1	–	11
$ – Conference champion; * Texas State and UTSA were not eligible for conference title or bowl games as part of their transition to the FBS.; Rankings from AP Poll

The 2012 Utah State Aggies football team represented Utah State University in the 2012 NCAA Division I FBS football season. The Aggies were led by fourth-year head coach Gary Andersen and played their home games at Merlin Olsen Field at Romney Stadium. This was the Aggies' final season as members of the Western Athletic Conference, winning the final WAC football title outright. They joined the Mountain West Conference on July 1, 2013 for the 2013 season.

== Before the season ==
=== 2012 recruits ===
College recruiting information (2012)
Name	Hometown	School	Height	Weight	Commit date
Tavarreon Dickerson; RB	Arlington, Texas	Arlington HS	5 ft 8 in (1.73 m)	170 lb (77 kg)	Nov 10, 2011
Tavarreon Dickerson; RB	Recruit ratings: Scout: Rivals: (74)				
Nick Vigil; RB	Ogden, Utah	Fremont HS	6 ft 1 in (1.85 m)	179 lb (81 kg)	Oct 5, 2011
Nick Vigil; RB	Recruit ratings: Scout: Rivals: (72)				
Jake Simonich; DT	Danville, California	San Ramon Valley HS	6 ft 5 in (1.96 m)	265 lb (120 kg)	Jan 9, 2012
Jake Simonich; DT	Recruit ratings: Scout: Rivals: (72)				
Delroy Hamilton; OLB	Hallandale, Florida	Hallandale HS	6 ft 1 in (1.85 m)	195 lb (88 kg)	Nov 29, 2011
Delroy Hamilton; OLB	Recruit ratings: Scout: Rivals: (71)				
D. J. Nelson; QB	Logan, Utah	Logan HS	5 ft 10 in (1.78 m)	175 lb (79 kg)	Sep 28, 2011
D. J. Nelson; QB	Recruit ratings: Scout: Rivals: (69)				
Bruce Natson; WR	Fort Lauderdale, Florida	Boyd Anderson HS	5 ft 6 in (1.68 m)	145 lb (66 kg)	Jun 20, 2011
Bruce Natson; WR	Recruit ratings: Scout: Rivals: (67)				
Marquan Ellison; WR	Milwaukee, Wisconsin	Bradley Tech HS	5 ft 11 in (1.80 m)	170 lb (77 kg)	Jan 21, 2012
Marquan Ellison; WR	Recruit ratings: Scout: Rivals: (NR)				
Andrew Chen; OG	Calabasas, California	Calabasas HS	6 ft 4 in (1.93 m)	216 lb (98 kg)	Jan 8, 2012
Andrew Chen; OG	Recruit ratings: Scout: Rivals: (NR)				
Logan Malohifo'ou; OT	Salt Lake City, Utah	Copper Hills HS	6 ft 7 in (2.01 m)	240 lb (110 kg)	Feb 1, 2012
Logan Malohifo'ou; OT	Recruit ratings: Scout: Rivals: (LQ)				
Dwayne Lorick; WR	Washington, D.C.	Anacostia HS	6 ft 4 in (1.93 m)	200 lb (91 kg)	Feb 1, 2012
Dwayne Lorick; WR	Recruit ratings: Scout: Rivals: (NR)				
Patrick Ward; OT	Glendale, Arizona	Glendale CC	6 ft 5 in (1.96 m)	285 lb (129 kg)	Jan 28, 2012
Patrick Ward; OT	Recruit ratings: Scout: Rivals: (JC)				
Bill Vavau; OG	Sandy, Utah	Snow CC	6 ft 3 in (1.91 m)	310 lb (140 kg)	Nov 29, 2011
Bill Vavau; OG	Recruit ratings: Scout: Rivals: (JC)				
Jordan Jenkins; WR	St. Louis, Missouri	Coffeyville CC	5 ft 10 in (1.78 m)	198 lb (90 kg)	Jan 10, 2012
Jordan Jenkins; WR	Recruit ratings: Scout: Rivals: (JC)				
Devonta Glover-Wright; CB	Thatcher, Arizona	Eastern Arizona CC	5 ft 11 in (1.80 m)	175 lb (79 kg)	Jan 21, 2012
Devonta Glover-Wright; CB	Recruit ratings: Scout: Rivals: (JC)				
Alex Wheat; WR	San Marcos, California	Palomar CC	6 ft 4 in (1.93 m)	210 lb (95 kg)	Jan 21, 2012
Alex Wheat; WR	Recruit ratings: Scout: Rivals: (JC)				
Overall recruit ranking: Scout: 123 Rivals: 115
Note: In many cases, Scout, Rivals, 247Sports, On3, and ESPN may conflict in their listings of height and weight.; In these cases, the average was taken. ESPN grades are on a 100-point scale.; Sources: "Utah State 2012 Football Commitments". Rivals.; "2012 Utah State Football Commits". Scout.; "2012 Player Commits". ESPN.; "Scout.com Team Recruiting Rankings". Scout.; "2012 Team Ranking". Rivals.com.

=== Blue-White Spring Game presented by Orbit Irrigation Products ===
The Spring Game took place on April 28, 2012 featuring the squad divided into a blue team and a white team. It quickly became obvious that offense would rule the day. Despite injuries to running back Kerwynn Williams and receiver Matt Austin, the Aggies offense compiled 330 yards passing offense and 482 yards total offense over 75-plays. The Blue team would sneak away with a 58-57 win. However, the QB battle didn't become any clearer. Both Chuckie Keeton and Adam Kennedy would have outstanding days in the new Aggies spread offense. Keeton went 16-of-25 for 187 yards and two touchdowns. Kennedy responded by going 16-for-22 for 143 yards, 1 touchdown, and 1 interception.

=== Departures ===
27 lettermen, 14 offensively and 13 defensively, didn't return to the Aggies for the 2012 football season. Among those are the following players that were drafted or signed contracts into the NFL.

==== Draft ====
Name	Number	Pos.	Class	Team	Round	Pick
Robert Turbin	6	RB	Junior	Seattle Seahawks	4	106
Bobby Wagner	9	LB	Senior	Seattle Seahawks	2	47
Michael Smith	20	RB	Senior	Tampa Bay Buccaneers	7	212

== Roster ==
2012 Utah State Aggies football team roster
Players
Coaches
Offense

Pos.	#	Name	Class
QB	13	Michael Chislock	Fr
QB	19	Craig Harrison	So
QB	16	Chuckie Keeton	So
QB	17	Jeff Manning	Fr
QB	12	Daniel Wray	So
RB	31	Paul Clark	So
RB	28	Joey DeMartino	Jr
RB	29	Tavarreon Dickerson	Fr
RB	32	Joe Hill	So
RB	27	Robert Marshall	Jr
RB	87	Travis Swann	So
RB	30	Abou Toure	Jr
RB	25	Kerwynn Williams	Sr
WR	4	Matt Austin	Sr
WR	80	Lars Gunderson	Jr
WR	10	Chuck Jacobs	Sr
WR	82	Jordan Jenkins	Jr
WR	18	Shaan Johnson	So
WR	9	Dwayne Lorick	Jr
WR	83	Bruce Natson	Fr
WR	8	Travis Reynolds	Jr
WR	6	Rashard Stewart	So
WR	85	Brandon Swindall	Fr
WR	7	Travis Van	Jr
WR	84	Cameron Webb	Sr
WR	11	Alex Wheat	So
TE	22	Keegan Andersen	So
TE	81	Kellen Bartlett	Sr
TE	45	Quincy Mason	Fr
TE	86	Brad Theurer	Jr
TE	91	D.J. Tialavea	Jr
OL	65	Austin Albrecht	Fr
OT	69	Andrew Chen	Fr
OL	75	Taani Fisilau	Fr
OL	65	Chris Friesen	Jr
LS	97	Mark Hutchinson	Fr
OL	64	Josh Larmay	So
C	58	Tyler Larsen	Jr
OL	79	Logan Malohifo'ou	Fr
OL	54	Jamie Markosian	Jr
OL	78	Jorden Mattinson	Fr
OL	67	Oscar Molina-Sanchez	Sr
LS	89	Nate Needham	So
OL	66	Eric Schultz	Jr
OL	76	Jake Simonich	Fr
OL	60	Joe Summers	So
OL	61	Daquan Vandross	Jr
OL	68	Bill Vavau	Jr
OL	62	Bryce Walker	So
OL	74	Kevin Whimpey	Jr
OL	73	Kyle Whimpey	Jr

Defense

Pos.	#	Name	Class
DE	94	Eric Berntson	Fr
DL	98	Jake Gallegos	Fr
DL	96	Elvis Kamana-Matagi	So
DL	92	Derek Keller	Fr
DL	90	Al Lapuaho	Sr
DL	99	B.J. Larsen	So
DL	57	Havea Lasike	Sr
DE	0	Tyrn Mesarch	Fr
DL	72	Jordan Nielsen	Fr
DL	56	AJ Pataialii	Jr
DL	48	Paul Piukala	Jr
DL	70	Travis Seefeldt	Fr
DL	95	Tevita Vaifoou	So
DE	40	Connor Williams	Jr
LB	59	Nick Ciancone	So
LB	33	Jefferson Court	Fr
LB	49	Forrest Dabb	Sr
LB	51	Jake Doughty	Jr
LB	52	Kyler Fackrell	Fr
LB	55	Bojay Filimoeatu	Sr
LB	39	Torrey Green	Fr
LB	50	Delroy Hamilton	Fr
LB	42	La'Bradford Harold	Fr
LB	31	Parker Hausknecht	So
LB	25	Gavin Jones	Sr
LB	32	Jason Luke	Jr
LB	43	Alex Marsaw	Fr
LB	16	Tavaris McMillian	So
LB	47	Travis Parrish	Fr
LB	0	Sharrieff Shah	Fr
LB	12	Terrell Thompson	Sr
LB	41	Nick Vigil	Fr
LB	53	Zach Vigil	Jr
CB	5	Terrence Alston	Sr
CB	36	McKade Brady	Sr
CB	3	Quinton Byrd	Sr
CB	37	Devin Centers	Fr
S	18	Clayton Christensen	Jr
CB	17	Will Davis	Jr
CB	30	Marquan Ellison	Fr
CB	20	Devonta Glover-Wright	Jr
CB	27	Dee Hamala	So
CB	13	Ladale Jackson	Fr
S	24	Isaiah Jones	Sr
CB	1	Nevin Lawson	Jr
S	23	Michael Okonkwo	Fr
CB	14	Jamaine Olson	Sr
S	20	Bridger Peck	Fr
CB	15	Jumanne Robertson	Sr
CB	2	Cameron Sanders	Jr
S	21	Brian Suite	So
SO	46	Frankie Sutera

Special teams

Pos.	#	Name	Class
P	88	Tyler Bennett	Sr
K	38	Jaron Bentrude	So
K	93	Nick Diaz	Jr
K	44	Jacob Haueter	So
K	19	Josh Thompson	Jr
K	63	Brock Warren	Fr

Head coach

- Gary Andersen (Utah)

Coordinators/assistant coaches

- Dave Aranda (Cal Lutheran)
  Defensive coordinator
- Bill Busch (Nebraska Wesleyan)
  Assoc. head coach/special teams coordinator/defensive backs
- Matt Wells (Utah State)
  Offensive coordinator/quarterbacks
- Jovon Bucknight (Wyoming)
  Wide receivers
- Kevin Clune (Cal State Fullerton)
  Linebackers
- Frank Maile (Utah State)
  Defensive line
- Mike Sanford (USC)
  Asst. head coach/running backs/tight ends
- Kendrick Shaver (Missouri State)
  Cornerbacks
- T. J. Woods (Azusa Pacific)
  Offensive line
- David Fiefia (Utah State)
  Offensive administrative assistant
- Vince Natali (New Mexico)
  Offensive graduate assistant
- Zach Nyborg (BYU)
  Defensive & recruiting administrative assistant
- Nick Schindler
  Administrative assistant
- Hunter Teafatiller (Nebraska)
  Offensive administrative assistant
- Spencer Toone (Utah)
  Defensive graduate assistant
- Mark Andersen (Westminster (UT))
  Director of football operations/business management
- Steve Mathis (Snow College)
  Team coordinator
- Evan Simon (Frostburg State)
  Strength and conditioning coach

Legend

- (C) Team captain
- (S) Suspended
- (I) Ineligible
- Injured
- Redshirt

Roster

=== Depth chart ===
Defense

FS
McKade Brady
Michael Okonkwo
Cameron Sanders

WLB	ILB	ILB	SLB
Terrell Thompson	Tavaris McMillian	Jake Doughty	⋅
Kyler Fackrell	Parker Hausknecht	Zach Vigil	⋅
⋅	⋅	⋅	⋅

SS
Brian Suite
Frankie Sutera
⋅

CB
Jumanne Robertson
Quinton Byrd
Ladale Jackson

DE	NT	DE
Connor Williams	Elvis kamana Matagi	Al Lapuaho
Eric Berntson	Travis Seedfelt	Jordan Nielsen
⋅	⋅	⋅

CB
Nevin Lawson
Isaiah Jones
⋅

Offense

X-WR
Matt Austin
Brandon Swindall
⋅

Z-WR
Travis Reynolds
Shaan Johnson
Jordan Jenkins

LT	LG	C	RG	RT
Kevin Whimpey	Jamie Markosian	Tyler Larsen	Eric Shultz	Oscar Molina-Sanchez
Logan Molohifo'ou	Kyle Whimpey	Chris Friesen	Bryce Walker	Jorden Mattinson
⋅	⋅	⋅	⋅	⋅

TE
D. J. Tialavea
Brad Theurer
⋅

T-WR
Chuck Jacobs
Rashard Stewart
Cameron Webb

QB
Chuckie Keeton
Adam Kennedy
⋅

RB
Kerwynn Williams
Robert Marshall
Joe Hill

Special teams
PK Josh Thompson
PK Nick Diaz
P Tyler Bennett
P Jaron Bentrude
KR Kerwynn Williams
PR Chuck Jacobs
LS Nate Needham

== Schedule ==
Date	Time	Opponent	Rank	Site	TV	Result	Attendance
August 30	6:00 pm	Southern Utah*		Romney Stadium; Logan, UT	KMYU/ESPN3	W 34–3	17,009
September 7	6:00 pm	Utah*		Romney Stadium; Logan, UT (Battle of the Brothers)	ESPN2	W 27–20 ^{OT}	25,513
September 15	6:00 pm	at No. 22 Wisconsin*		Camp Randall Stadium; Madison, WI	BTN	L 14–16	79,332
September 22	5:00 pm	at Colorado State*		Hughes Stadium; Fort Collins, CO	KMYU/KTVD	W 31–19	23,374
September 29	6:00 pm	UNLV*^{†}		Romney Stadium; Logan, UT	ESPN3	W 35–13	24,226
October 5	8:15 pm	at BYU*		LaVell Edwards Stadium; Provo, UT (The Old Wagon Wheel)	ESPN	L 3–6	63,086
October 13	2:00 pm	at San Jose State		Spartan Stadium; San Jose, CA	ESPN+/ALT/ESPN3	W 49–27	15,168
October 20	1:00 pm	New Mexico State		Romney Stadium; Logan, UT	KMYU/ESPN3	W 41–7	17,001
October 27	12:00 pm	at UTSA		Alamodome; San Antonio, TX	ESPN3	W 48–17	23,519
November 3	1:00 pm	Texas State		Romney Stadium; Logan, UT	KMYU	W 38–7	17,222
November 17	5:00 pm	at No. 19 Louisiana Tech		Joe Aillet Stadium; Ruston, LA	ESPN3	W 48–41 ^{OT}	25,614
November 24	1:00 pm	Idaho	No. 25	Romney Stadium; Logan, UT	ESPN+/ALT/ESPN3	W 45–9	19,350
December 15	2:30 pm	vs. Toledo*	No. 18	Bronco Stadium; Boise, ID (Famous Idaho Potato Bowl)	ESPN	W 41–15	29,243
*Non-conference game; ^{†}Homecoming; Rankings from AP Poll released prior to the game; All times are in Mountain time

== Game summaries ==
=== Southern Utah ===
Southern Utah at Utah State

Team	1	2	3	4	Total
Southern Utah Thunderbirds	0	3	0	0	3
• Utah State Aggies	21	0	7	6	34

- Date: August 30
- Location: Romney Stadium
  Logan, UT
- Game start: 6:07 pm MST
- Elapsed time: 3:01
- Game attendance: 17,009
- Game weather: 84 °F (29 °C)
- Referee: Robert Cameron
- TV announcers (KMYU): Mychal Clanton, Kevin White, and Brooks Hansen

Scoring summary

Quarter	Time	Drive			Team	Scoring information	Score	
Quarter	Time	Plays	Yards	TOP	Team	Scoring information	So. Utah	Utah St.
1	8:51	11	97	4:57	Utah State	Chuck Jacobs 48-yard touchdown reception from Chuckie Keeton, Brock Warren kick good	0	7
1	6:15	3	45	1:14	Utah State	Matt Austin 35-yard touchdown reception from Chuckie Keeton, Brock Warren kick good	0	14
1	1:01	9	98	3:44	Utah State	Joe Hill 27-yard touchdown run, Brock Warren kick good	0	21
2	7:49	15	70	8:05	Southern Utah	22-yard field goal by Colton Cook	3	21
3	11:53	8	77	3:07	Utah State	Joe Hill 19-yard touchdown run, Brock Warren kick good	3	28
4	14:51	2	49	0:20	Utah State	Joe Hill 33-yard touchdown run, Jaron Bentrude kick No good	3	34
"TOP" = time of possession. For other American football terms, see Glossary of American football.							3	34

=== Utah ===
Utah at Utah State

Team	1	2	3	4	OT	Total
Utah Utes	0	3	10	7	0	20
• Utah State Aggies	13	0	0	7	7	27

- Date: September 7
- Location: Romney Stadium
  Logan, UT
- Game start: 6:06 pm MST
- Elapsed time: 3:38
- Game attendance: 25,513
- Game weather: 80 °F (27 °C), Clear
- Referee: Shawn Hochuli
- TV announcers (ESPN2): Carter Blackburn, Rod Gilmore, and Jemele Hill

Scoring summary

Quarter	Time	Drive			Team	Scoring information	Score	
Quarter	Time	Plays	Yards	TOP	Team	Scoring information	Utah	Utah St.
1	7:59				Utah State	Clayton Christensen recovery of blocked field goal in the end zone for a touchdown, Brock Warren kick good	0	7
1	0:03	6	72	2:13	Utah State	Joe Hill 15-yard touchdown reception from Chuckie Keeton, Brock Warren kick no good	0	13
2	0:00	9	48	1:11	Utah	42-yard field goal by Coleman Peterson	3	13
3	11:34	4	53	1:29	Utah	Kenneth Scott 28-yard touchdown reception from Travis Wilson, Coleman Peterson kick good	10	13
3	4:22	5	22	2:38	Utah	40-yard field goal by Coleman Peterson	13	13
4	9:10	3	66	0:44	Utah State	Kellen Bartlett 4-yard touchdown reception from Chuckie Keeton, Josh Thompson kick good	13	20
4	3:18	5	67	2:00	Utah	Kenneth Scott 24-yard touchdown reception from Jon Hays, Coleman Peterson kick good	20	20
OT		5	25		Utah State	Kerwynn Williams 1-yard touchdown run, Josh Thompson kick good	20	27
"TOP" = time of possession. For other American football terms, see Glossary of American football.							20	27

=== @ Wisconsin ===
Utah State at Wisconsin

Team	1	2	3	4	Total
Utah State Aggies	7	7	0	0	14
• #22 Wisconsin Badgers	0	3	13	0	16

- Date: September 15
- Location: Camp Randall Stadium
  Madison, WI
- Game start: 6:01 pm MST
- Elapsed time: 3:10
- Game attendance: 79,332
- Game weather: 76 °F (24 °C), Clear, Winds WSW at 8mph
- Referee: Todd Geerlings
- TV announcers (BTN): Matt Devlin, Glen Mason, and Jay Wilson

Scoring summary

Quarter	Time	Drive			Team	Scoring information	Score	
Quarter	Time	Plays	Yards	TOP	Team	Scoring information	Utah St.	Wisconsin
1	9:17	3	52	0:51	Utah State	Kerwynn Williams 39-yard touchdown reception from Chuckie Keeton, Josh Thompson kick good	7	0
2	14:16	10	62	5:23	Wisconsin	19-yard field goal by Kyle French	7	3
2	00:29	5	24	1:48	Utah State	Matt Austin 11-yard touchdown reception from Chuckie Keeton, Josh Thompson kick good	14	3
3	7:06				Wisconsin	Kenzel Doe 82-yard punt return for a touchdown, Kyle French kick good	14	10
3	3:06	6	42	3:03	Wisconsin	Montee Ball 17-yard touchdown run, Kyle French kick blocked	14	16
"TOP" = time of possession. For other American football terms, see Glossary of American football.							14	16

=== @ Colorado State ===
Utah State at Colorado State

Team	1	2	3	4	Total
• Utah State Aggies	10	7	7	7	31
Colorado State Rams	0	0	6	13	19

- Date: September 22
- Location: Hughes Stadium
  Ft. Collins, CO
- Game start: 5:06 pm MST
- Elapsed time: 3:04
- Game attendance: 23,374
- Game weather: 74 °F (23 °C), Fair, Winds S at 6mph
- Referee: Clair Gausman
- TV announcers (KMYU): Bill Doleman, Reggie Rivers, and Natalie Vickers

Scoring summary

Quarter	Time	Drive			Team	Scoring information	Score	
Quarter	Time	Plays	Yards	TOP	Team	Scoring information	Utah St.	Colorado St.
1	9:52	8	77	2:26	Utah State	Kerwynn Williams 26-yard touchdown run, Josh Thompson kick good	7	0
1	1:58	9	45	3:27	Utah State	20-yard field goal by Josh Thompson	10	0
2	7:14	19	85	7:46	Utah State	Matt Austin 1-yard touchdown reception from Chuckie Keeton, Josh Thompson kick good	17	0
3	7:10	7	42	2:14	Colorado State	28-yard field goal by Jared Roberts	17	3
3	2:23	8	39	4:05	Colorado State	31-yard field goal by Jared Roberts	17	6
3	0:42	4	75	1:41	Utah State	Kerwynn Williams 58-yard touchdown run, Josh Thompson kick good	24	6
4	10:40	15	75	5:02	Colorado State	Dominique Vinson 4-yard touchdown reception from Garret Grayson, 2-point Garret Grayson pass failed	24	12
4	7:50	5	43	2:40	Utah State	Joe Hill 15-yard touchdown run, Josh Thompson kick good	31	12
4	1:43	12	91	2:55	Colorado State	Marquise Law 29-yard touchdown reception from Garret Grayson, Jared Roberts kick good	31	19
"TOP" = time of possession. For other American football terms, see Glossary of American football.							31	19

=== UNLV ===
UNLV at Utah State

Team	1	2	3	4	Total
UNLV Rebels	0	7	6	0	13
• Utah State Aggies	0	20	0	15	35

- Date: September 29
- Location: Romney Stadium
  Logan, UT
- Game start: 6:07 pm MST
- Elapsed time: 3:23
- Game attendance: 24,226
- Game weather: 75 °F (24 °C), Clear, Winds SW at 5mph
- Referee: Eddy Shelton
- TV announcers (ESPN3): Trey Bender and Jay Taylor

Scoring summary

Quarter	Time	Drive			Team	Scoring information	Score	
Quarter	Time	Plays	Yards	TOP	Team	Scoring information	UNLV	Utah St.
2	14:16	12	52	3:40	Utah State	32-yard field goal by Josh Thompson	0	3
2	10:45	6	78	3:25	UNLV	Max Johnson 3-yard touchdown reception from Nick Sherry, Nolan Kohorst kick good	7	3
2	7:24	9	75	3:21	Utah State	D. J. Tialavea 1-yard touchdown reception from Chuckie Keeton, Josh Thompson kick good	7	10
2	5:25	2	50	0:11	Utah State	Chuck Jacobs 50-yard touchdown reception from Chuckie Keeton, Josh Thompson kick good	7	17
2	0:00	4	69	0:31	Utah State	31-yard field goal by Josh Thompson	7	20
3	12:44	5	15	2:07	UNLV	24-yard field goal by Nolan Kohorst	10	20
3	1:21	15	76	6:51	UNLV	26-yard field goal by Nolan Kohorst	13	20
4	14:44	3	75	1:37	Utah State	Kerwynn Williams 74-yard touchdown reception from Chuckie Keeton, Josh Thompson kick good	13	27
4	10:47	6	82	2:22	Utah State	Chuck Jacobs 17-yard touchdown reception from Chuckie Keeton, Josh Thompson kick failed	13	33
4	5:10				Utah State	Team Safety	13	35
"TOP" = time of possession. For other American football terms, see Glossary of American football.							13	35

=== @ BYU ===
Utah State at BYU

Team	1	2	3	4	Total
Utah State Aggies	3	0	0	0	3
• BYU Cougars	0	6	0	0	6

- Date: October 5
- Location: LaVell Edwards Stadium
  Provo, UT
- Game start: 8:26 pm MST
- Elapsed time: 3:09
- Game attendance: 63,086
- Game weather: 54 °F (12 °C), Clear, winds Calm
- Referee: Clair Gausman
- TV announcers (ESPN/BYUtv): Carter Blackburn, Rod Gilmore, and Shelley Smith (ESPN); Dave McCann, Blaine Fowler, and Robbie Bullough (BYUtv)

Scoring summary

Quarter	Time	Drive			Team	Scoring information	Score	
Quarter	Time	Plays	Yards	TOP	Team	Scoring information	Utah State	BYU
1	0:34	12	50	5:59	Utah State	26-yard field goal by Josh Thompson	3	0
2	0:03	4	61	0:25	BYU	JD Falslev 2-yard touchdown reception from Taysom Hill, Riley Stephenson kick no good	3	6
"TOP" = time of possession. For other American football terms, see Glossary of American football.							3	6

=== @ San Jose State ===
Utah State at San Jose State

Team	1	2	3	4	Total
• Utah State Aggies	14	14	14	7	49
San Jose State Spartans	3	17	7	0	27

- Date: October 13
- Location: Spartan Stadium
  San Jose, CA
- Game start: 2:05 pm MST
- Elapsed time: 3:20
- Game attendance: 15,168
- Game weather: 66 °F (19 °C), Sunny, winds WSW 10mph
- Referee: Jim Farmer
- TV announcers (ESPN+): Trey Bender and Jay Taylor

Scoring summary

Quarter	Time	Drive			Team	Scoring information	Score	
Quarter	Time	Plays	Yards	TOP	Team	Scoring information	Utah St.	San Jose St.
1	10:07	12	67	4:53	San Jose State	25-yard field goal by Austin Lopez	0	3
1	5:57	13	86	4:10	Utah State	Chuck Jacobs 17-yard touchdown reception from Chuckie Keeton, Nick Diaz kick good	7	3
1	1:37	4	53	0:57	Utah State	Matt Austin 5-yard touchdown reception from Chuckie Keeton, Nick Diaz kick good	14	3
2	14:18	1	50	0:09	Utah State	Kerwynn Williams 50-yard touchdown run, Nick Diaz kick good	21	3
2	9:26	6	50	2:29	Utah State	Travis Van Leeuwen 21-yard touchdown reception from Chuckie Keeton, Nick Diaz kick good	28	3
2	6:18	7	75	3:08	San Jose State	Kyle Nunn 3-yard touchdown reception from David Fales, Austin Lopez kick good	28	10
2	3:13	5	54	1:54	San Jose State	26-yard field goal by Austin Lopez	28	13
2	0:24	9	85	0:54	San Jose State	Noel Grigsby 20-yard touchdown reception from David Fales, Austin Lopez kick good	28	20
3	13:47	3	94	1:13	Utah State	Kerwynn Williams 86-yard touchdown run, Nick Diaz kick good	35	20
3	9:55	8	68	2:28	Utah State	Chuckie Keeton 28-yard touchdown run, Nick Diaz kick good	42	20
3	1:56	6	62	2:28	San Jose State	Noel Grigsby 4-yard touchdown reception from David Fales, Austin Lopez kick good	42	27
4	2:44	2	27	0:49	Utah State	Kerwynn Williams 12-yard touchdown run, Nick Diaz kick good	49	27
"TOP" = time of possession. For other American football terms, see Glossary of American football.							49	27

=== New Mexico State ===
New Mexico State at Utah State

Team	1	2	3	4	Total
New Mexico State Aggies	0	0	7	0	7
• Utah State Aggies	14	14	10	3	41

- Date: October 20
- Location: Romney Stadium
  Logan, UT
- Game start: 1:07 pm MST
- Elapsed time: 2:53
- Game attendance: 17,001
- Game weather: 66 °F (19 °C), Light Breeze
- Referee: Stacey Hardin
- TV announcers (KMYU): Mychal Clanton, Kevin White, and Brooks Hansen

Scoring summary

Quarter	Time	Drive			Team	Scoring information	Score	
Quarter	Time	Plays	Yards	TOP	Team	Scoring information	New Mexico St.	Utah St.
1	14:38	1	76	0:22	Utah State	Kerwynn Williams 76-yard touchdown reception from Chuckie Keeton, Nick Diaz kick good	0	7
1	6:26	7	80	2:18	Utah State	Chuck Jacobs 49-yard touchdown reception from Chuckie Keeton, Nick Diaz kick good	0	14
2	14:37	1	76	0:12	Utah State	Kerwynn Williams 76-yard touchdown run, Nick Diaz kick good	0	21
2	0:39	10	69	3:33	Utah State	Kerwynn Williams 3-yard touchdown run, Nick Diaz kick good	0	28
3	8:15	7	8	3:06	Utah State	53-yard field goal by Nick Diaz	0	31
3	8:15	6	76	2:33	New Mexico State	Austin Franklin 6-yard touchdown reception from Andrew Manley, Marcus Johnson kick good	7	31
3	1:01	8	52	3:38	Utah State	Chuckie Keeton 9-yard touchdown run, Nick Diaz kick good	7	38
4	12:13	6	18	2:35	Utah State	48-yard field goal by Nick Diaz	7	41
"TOP" = time of possession. For other American football terms, see Glossary of American football.							7	41

=== @ UTSA ===
Utah State at UTSA

Team	1	2	3	4	Total
• Utah State Aggies	7	20	21	0	48
UTSA Roadrunners	3	0	7	7	17

- Date: October 27
- Location: Alamodome
  San Antonio, TX
- Game start: 12:05 pm MST
- Elapsed time: 3:07
- Game attendance: 23,519
- Game weather: 72 °F (22 °C), Indoors
- Referee: Clair Gausman
- TV announcers (ESPN3): Jonathan Yardley and Forest Conoly

Scoring summary

Quarter	Time	Drive			Team	Scoring information	Score	
Quarter	Time	Plays	Yards	TOP	Team	Scoring information	Utah St.	UTSA
1	12:11	2	5	0:41	Utah State	Kelley Bartlett 2-yard touchdown reception from Chuckie Keeton, Nick Diaz kick good	7	0
1	3:00	10	68	5:26	UTSA	29-yard field goal by Kristian Stern	7	3
2	14:44	8	68	3:16	Utah State	22-yard field goal by Nick Diaz	10	3
2	9:34	10	71	3:21	Utah State	Kerwynn Williams 1-yard touchdown run, Nick Diaz kick good	17	3
2	6:44	5	50	1:35	Utah State	Cameron Webb 29-yard touchdown reception from Chuckie Keeton, Nick Diaz kick good	24	3
2	1:26	9	42	2:43	Utah State	24-yard field goal by Nick Diaz	27	3
3	14:09	3	72	0:51	Utah State	Kerwynn Williams 1-yard touchdown run, Nick Diaz kick good	34	3
3	11:14	4	44	1:12	Utah State	Joe Hill 1-yard touchdown run, Nick Diaz kick good	41	3
3	8:55	6	75	2:19	UTSA	Evans Okotcha 7-yard touchdown run, Kristian Stern kick good	41	10
3	0:46	10	65	3:48	Utah State	Joe Hill 16-yard touchdown reception from Chuckie Keeton, Nick Diaz kick good	48	10
4	13:36	1	23	0:08	UTSA	Cole Hicks 23-yard touchdown reception from Ryan Polite, Kristian Stern kick good	48	17
"TOP" = time of possession. For other American football terms, see Glossary of American football.							48	17

=== Texas State ===
Texas State at Utah State

Team	1	2	3	4	Total
Texas State Bobcats	0	0	7	0	7
• Utah State Aggies	14	21	3	0	38

- Date: November 3
- Location: Romney Stadium
  Logan, UT
- Game start: 1:07 pm MST
- Elapsed time: 2:43
- Game attendance: 17,222
- Game weather: 53 °F (12 °C), Sparse Clouds, winds N 5 mph
- Referee: Jim Farmer
- TV announcers (KMYU): Mychal Clanton, Kevin White, and Brooks Hansen

Scoring summary

Quarter	Time	Drive			Team	Scoring information	Score	
Quarter	Time	Plays	Yards	TOP	Team	Scoring information	Texas St.	Utah St.
1	12:46	6	51	2:14	Utah State	Travis Reynolds 4-yard touchdown reception from Chuckie Keeton, Nick Diaz kick good	0	7
1	3:53	5	80	1:50	Utah State	Kelley Bartlett 2-yard touchdown reception from Chuckie Keeton, Nick Diaz kick good	0	14
2	11:09	4	72	1:34	Utah State	Chuckie Keeton 3-yard touchdown run, Nick Diaz kick good	0	21
2	6:52	6	54	2:30	Utah State	Bruce Natson 23-yard touchdown reception from Chuckie Keeton, Nick Diaz kick good	0	28
2	0:46	7	88	3:14	Utah State	Matt Austin 4-yard touchdown reception from Chuckie Keeton, Nick Diaz kick good	0	35
3	10:44	2	6	0:39	Texas State	Marcus Curry 3-yard touchdown run, Will Johnson kick good	7	35
3	6:04	10	51	4:34	Utah State	48-yard field goal by Nick Diaz	7	38
"TOP" = time of possession. For other American football terms, see Glossary of American football.							7	38

=== @ Louisiana Tech ===
Utah State at Louisiana Tech

Team	1	2	3	4	OT	Total
• Utah State Aggies	14	3	24	0	7	48
#19 Louisiana Tech Bulldogs	0	3	21	17	0	41

- Date: November 17
- Location: Joe Aillet Stadium
  Ruston, LA
- Game start: 2:04 pm MST
- Elapsed time: 3:42
- Game attendance: 25,614
- Game weather: 65 °F (18 °C), Clear, winds Calm
- Referee: Robert Cameron
- TV announcers (ESPN3): Trey Bender and John Bunting

Scoring summary

Quarter	Time	Drive			Team	Scoring information	Score	
Quarter	Time	Plays	Yards	TOP	Team	Scoring information	Utah St.	La. Tech
1	13:57	1	86	0:15	Utah State	Kerwynn Williams 86-yard touchdown reception from Chuckie Keeton, Nick Diaz kick good	7	0
1	0:58	16	86	6:00	Utah State	Kelley Bartlett 3-yard touchdown reception from Chuckie Keeton, Nick Diaz kick good	14	0
2	12:19	11	54	3:39	Louisiana Tech	36-yard field goal by Matt Nelson	14	3
2	3:55	5	45	2:09	Utah State	38-yard field goal by Nick Diaz	17	3
3	13:24	5	78	1:36	Utah State	Chuckie Keeton 13-yard touchdown run, Nick Diaz kick good	24	3
3	11:34	4	0	1:50	Utah State	30-yard field goal by Nick Diaz	27	3
3	8:17	11	78	3:17	Louisiana Tech	Kenneth Dixon 2-yard touchdown run, Matt Nelson kick good	27	10
3	5:20	7	66	2:57	Utah State	Chuckie Keeton 25-yard touchdown run, Nick Diaz kick good	34	10
3	4:04	4	75	1:16	Louisiana Tech	Myles White 25-yard touchdown reception from Cameron Colby, Matt Nelson kick good	34	17
3	1:00	9	77	3:04	Utah State	Kerwynn Williams 1-yard touchdown run, Nick Diaz kick good	41	17
3	0:48				Louisiana Tech	D. J. Banks 98-yard kickoff return for a Touchdown, Matt Nelson kick good	41	24
4	10:54	12	80	3:11	Louisiana Tech	Kenneth Dixon 1-yard touchdown run, Matt Nelson kick good	41	31
4	1:54	8	86	1:24	Louisiana Tech	Hunter Lee 7-yard touchdown run, Matt Nelson kick good	41	38
4	0:00	11	62	1:24	Louisiana Tech	32-yard field goal by Matt Nelson	41	41
OT		3	25		Utah State	Kerwynn Williams 4-yard touchdown run, Nick Diaz kick good	48	41
"TOP" = time of possession. For other American football terms, see Glossary of American football.							48	41

=== Idaho ===
Idaho at Utah St.

Team	1	2	3	4	Total
Idaho Vandals	0	6	3	0	9
• #25 Utah State Aggies	14	7	7	17	45

- Date: November 24
- Location: Romney Stadium
  Logan, UT
- Game start: 1:00 p.m. MST
- Game attendance: 19,350
- TV announcers (ESPN+): Trey Bender and Jay Taylor

Scoring summary

Quarter	Time	Drive			Team	Scoring information	Score	
Quarter	Time	Plays	Yards	TOP	Team	Scoring information	Idaho	Utah St.
1	9:42	3	11	1:15	Utah State	Kerwynn Williams 19-yard touchdown reception from Chuckie Keeton, Nick Diaz kick good	0	7
1	5:06	8	23	2:24	Utah State	Chuckie Keeton 1-yard touchdown run, Nick Diaz kick good	0	14
2	13:03	0	0	0:00	Utah State	Interception returned 59 yards for touchdown by Will Davis, Nick Diaz kick good	0	21
2	7:59	11	54	5:04	Idaho	38-yard field goal by Trey Farquhar	3	21
2	0:04	12	37	6:00	Idaho	46-yard field goal by Trey Farquhar	6	21
3	9:55	11	43	5:05	Idaho	52-yard field goal by Trey Farquhar	9	21
3	9:20	2	55	00:27	Utah State	Kellen Bartlett 3-yard touchdown reception from Chuckie Keeton, Nick Diaz kick good/no good (blocked)/no good (miss right)/no good (miss left)/no good (miss short)/no good	9	28
4	11:31	4	45	1:42	Utah State	45-yard field goal by Nick Diaz	9	31
4	8:53	3	39	1:03	Utah State	Kerwynn Williams 14-yard touchdown run, Nick Diaz kick good	9	38
4	1:42	9	65	5:01	Utah State	Joe Hill 7-yard touchdown run, Nick Diaz kick good	9	45
"TOP" = time of possession. For other American football terms, see Glossary of American football.							9	45

=== Toledo (Famous Idaho Potato Bowl) ===
Toledo at Utah St.

Team	1	2	3	4	Total
Toledo Rockets	3	3	0	9	15
• #18 Utah State Aggies	7	3	3	28	41

- Date: December 15
- Location: Bronco Stadium
  Boise, ID
- Game start: 2:37 pm MST
- Game attendance: 29,243
- Game weather: 41 °F (5 °C), Overcast
- Referee: Eddie Shelton
- TV announcers (ESPN/ ESPN Radio): Tom Hart, Mike Bellotti, and Quint Kessenich (ESPN); Rich Cellini, Tom Ramsey, and Shelley Smith (ESPN Radio)

Scoring summary

Quarter	Time	Drive			Team	Scoring information	Score	
Quarter	Time	Plays	Yards	TOP	Team	Scoring information	Toledo	Utah St.
1	13:06	5	49	1:54	Toledo	37-yard field goal by Jeremiah Detmer	3	0
1	3:07	6	85	2:29	Utah State	Chuckie Keeton 65-yard touchdown run, Nick Diaz kick good	3	7
2	9:57	9	50	4:54	Toledo	37-yard field goal by Jeremiah Detmer	6	7
2	0:00	7	86	1:39	Utah State	27-yard field goal by Nick Diaz	6	10
3	11:12	7	35	3:48	Utah State	44-yard field goal by Nick Diaz	6	13
4	7:28	7	35	1:42	Toledo	29-yard field goal by Jeremiah Detmer	9	13
4	6:57	2	70	0:31	Utah State	Kerwynn Williams 63-yard touchdown run, Nick Diaz kick good	9	20
4	6:57	3	62	1:23	Utah State	Kerwynn Williams 5-yard touchdown run, Nick Diaz kick good	9	27
4	3:41	2	39	0:40	Utah State	Kerwynn Williams 25-yard touchdown run, Nick Diaz kick good	9	34
4	3:29				Toledo	Bernard Reedy 87-yard kickoff return for a Touchdown, 2-point conversion pass dropped	15	34
4	1:29	2	56	0:42	Utah State	Joe Hill 24-yard touchdown run, Nick Diaz kick good	15	41
"TOP" = time of possession. For other American football terms, see Glossary of American football.							15	41
