= 2012 Idaho Vandals football team =

American college football season

2012 Idaho Vandals football
- Conference: Western Athletic Conference
- Record: 1–11 (1–5 WAC)
- Head coach: Robb Akey (6th season; first 8 games); Jason Gesser (interim; final 4 games)
- Offensive coordinator: Jason Gesser (1st season)
- Offensive scheme: Spread
- Defensive coordinator: Mark Criner (6th season)
- Base defense: 4–3
- Home stadium: Kibbie Dome

2012 Western Athletic Conference football standings
	Conf.			Overall
Team	W		L	W		L
No. 16 Utah State $	6	–	0	11	–	2
No. 21 San Jose State	5	–	1	11	–	2
Louisiana Tech	4	–	2	9	–	3
UTSA *	3	–	3	8	–	4
Texas State *	2	–	4	4	–	8
Idaho	1	–	5	1	–	11
New Mexico State	0	–	6	1	–	11
$ – Conference champion; * Texas State and UTSA were not eligible for conference title or bowl games as part of their transition to the FBS.; Rankings from AP Poll

The 2012 Idaho Vandals football team represented the University of Idaho in the 2012 NCAA Division I FBS football season. The Vandals were led by sixth-year head coach Robb Akey for the first eight games and played their home games on campus at the Kibbie Dome. This was Idaho's final season as a member of the Western Athletic Conference; the WAC ceased to support football after the 2012 season, and Idaho played as an independent in football in 2013.

After achieving a 20–50 (.286) record while head coach and a 1–7 record in 2012, Akey's contract was terminated on October 21. First-year offensive coordinator Jason Gesser was appointed interim head coach for the final four games, in which the Vandals were winless.

Idaho finished the season 1–11, 1–5 in conference to finish in sixth place in the seven-team WAC. On December 3, Paul Petrino was hired as head coach for the 2013 season.

== Schedule ==
Date	Time	Opponent	Site	TV	Result	Attendance
August 30	6:00 pm	No. 12 (FCS) Eastern Washington*	Kibbie Dome; Moscow, ID	ESPN3	L 3–20	11,136
September 8	4:00 pm	at Bowling Green*	Doyt Perry Stadium; Bowling Green, OH	KTRV/ALT	L 13–21	16,591
September 15	5:00 pm	at No. 3 LSU*	Tiger Stadium; Baton Rouge, LA	TigerVision PPV	L 14–63	92,177
September 22	2:00 pm	Wyoming*	Kibbie Dome; Moscow, ID	ESPN3	L 37–40 ^{OT}	13,558
September 29	12:30 pm	at North Carolina*	Kenan Memorial Stadium; Chapel Hill, NC	ACCRN/ESPN3	L 0–66	32,000
October 6	2:00 pm	New Mexico State^{†}	Kibbie Dome; Moscow, ID	KTRV/ALT	W 26–18	14,755
October 13	4:00 pm	at Texas State	Bobcat Stadium; San Marcos, TX	KTRV/ALT	L 7–38	16,973
October 20	4:00 pm	at Louisiana Tech	Joe Aillet Stadium; Ruston, LA	ESPN+/ESPN3/ALT (delayed)	L 28–70	20,255
November 3	2:00 pm	San Jose State	Kibbie Dome; Moscow, ID	KTRV/ALT2	L 13–42	14,429
November 10	7:15 pm	at BYU*	LaVell Edwards Stadium; Provo, UT	ESPNU	L 13–52	61,009
November 17	2:00 pm	UTSA	Kibbie Dome; Moscow, ID	KCWX	L 27–34	9,030
November 24	12:00 pm	at No. 25 Utah State	Romney Stadium; Logan, UT	ESPN+/ESPN3/ALT	L 9–45	19,350
*Non-conference game; ^{†}Homecoming; Rankings from AP Poll released prior to the game; All times are in Pacific time

== Game summaries ==
=== Eastern Washington ===
	1	2	3	4	Total
Eagles	3	7	3	7	20
Vandals	3	0	0	0	3

=== @ Bowling Green ===
	1	2	3	4	Total
Vandals	0	6	0	7	13
Falcons	7	0	14	0	21

=== @ LSU ===
	1	2	3	4	Total
Vandals	0	14	0	0	14
#3 Tigers	14	14	21	14	63

=== Wyoming ===
	1	2	3	4	OT	Total
Cowboys	14	0	6	14	6	40
Vandals	6	14	7	7	3	37

=== @ North Carolina ===
	1	2	3	4	Total
Vandals	0	0	0	0	0
Tar Heels	28	17	14	7	66

=== New Mexico State ===
	1	2	3	4	Total
Aggies	3	7	0	8	18
Vandals	10	10	6	0	26

=== @ Texas State ===
	1	2	3	4	Total
Vandals	0	7	0	0	7
Bobcats	7	7	10	14	38

=== @ Louisiana Tech ===
	1	2	3	4	Total
Vandals	14	7	0	7	28
Bulldogs	35	21	14	0	70

=== San Jose State ===
	1	2	3	4	Total
Spartans	0	14	14	14	42
Vandals	7	0	6	0	13

=== @ BYU ===
	1	2	3	4	Total
Vandals	7	0	3	3	13
Cougars	28	14	0	10	52

=== UTSA ===
	1	2	3	4	Total
Roadrunners	10	10	0	14	34
Vandals	3	0	14	10	27

=== @ Utah State ===
	1	2	3	4	Total
Vandals	0	6	3	0	9
#25 Aggies	14	7	7	17	45

== NFL draft ==
No Vandals were selected in the 2013 NFL draft, but defensive end Benson Mayowa made the opening day roster of the Seattle Seahawks as a rookie free agent.
