= I-35 Rivalry =

College rivalry

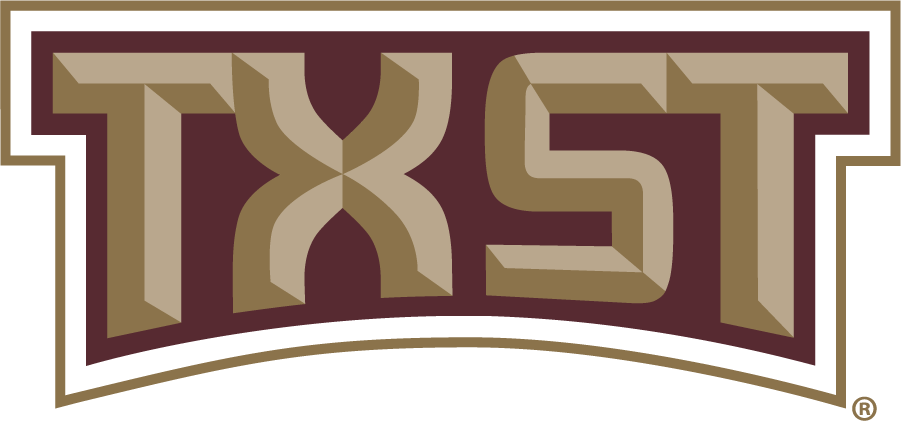
- UTSA Roadrunners Texas State Bobcats
- Sport: Football, volleyball, soccer, basketball, tennis, track and field, softball, golf, baseball
- First meeting: 1991
- Trophy: I-35 Series Trophy

Locations of Texas State and UTSA

The I-35 Rivalry (officially the I-35 Maroon vs. Orange Rivalry Series) is a college rivalry between the Texas State University Bobcats (TXST) and the University of Texas at San Antonio Roadrunners (UTSA). It is named for the Interstate Highway that connects San Marcos, Texas, and San Antonio, Texas, the respective sites of both universities.

== History ==
=== Series results ===
| Texas State victories | UTSA victories |

| No. | Date | Winner | Score |
|---|---|---|---|
| 1 | 1991–1992 | UTSA | – |
| 2 | 1992–1993 | UTSA | – |
| 3 | 1993–1994 | Southwest Texas State | – |
| 4 | 1994–1995 | UTSA | – |
| 5 | 1995–1996 | UTSA | – |
| 6 | 1996–1997 | Southwest Texas State | – |
| 7 | 1998–1999 | UTSA | – |
| 8 | 1999–2000 | Southwest Texas State | – |
| 9 | 2000–2001 | UTSA | – |
| 10 | 2003–2004 | UTSA | – |
| 11 | 2004–2005 | UTSA | – |
| 12 | 2005–2006 | Texas State | – |
| 13 | 2006–2007 | Texas State | – |
| 14 | 2007–2008 | Texas State | – |
| 15 | 2008–2009 | UTSA | – |
| 16 | 2009–2010 | Texas State | – |
| 17 | 2010–2011 | Texas State | – |
| 18 | 2011–2012 | Texas State | – |
| 19 | 2012–2013 | UTSA | – |
| 20 | 2017–2018 | UTSA | – |
| 21 | 2018–2019 | UTSA | – |
| 22 | 2020–2021 | UTSA | – |
Series: UTSA leads 13–9

=== Start of a big rivalry (1991) ===
The rivalry dates back to 1991, when the University of Texas at San Antonio joined as a non-football member of the Southland Conference. Southwest Texas State University, which had joined the conference four years prior, is located less than 60 miles from the UTSA main campus. Due to their proximity, conference membership, and status as emerging research universities, the rivalry began to develop. It was fostered by a desire to bring attention to collegiate athletics in Central Texas.

Eventually, a trophy was utilized in the mid-1990s to recognize the winner of the annual men's basketball game between the two universities. In 2007, the competition was expanded to all sports, with the new I-35 Series Trophy being awarded to the winner. Prior to this new moniker and point-based scheme, the rivalry's name was unofficial, with the term "I-35 rivalry" being used by other schools and teams to label their own athletic competitions.

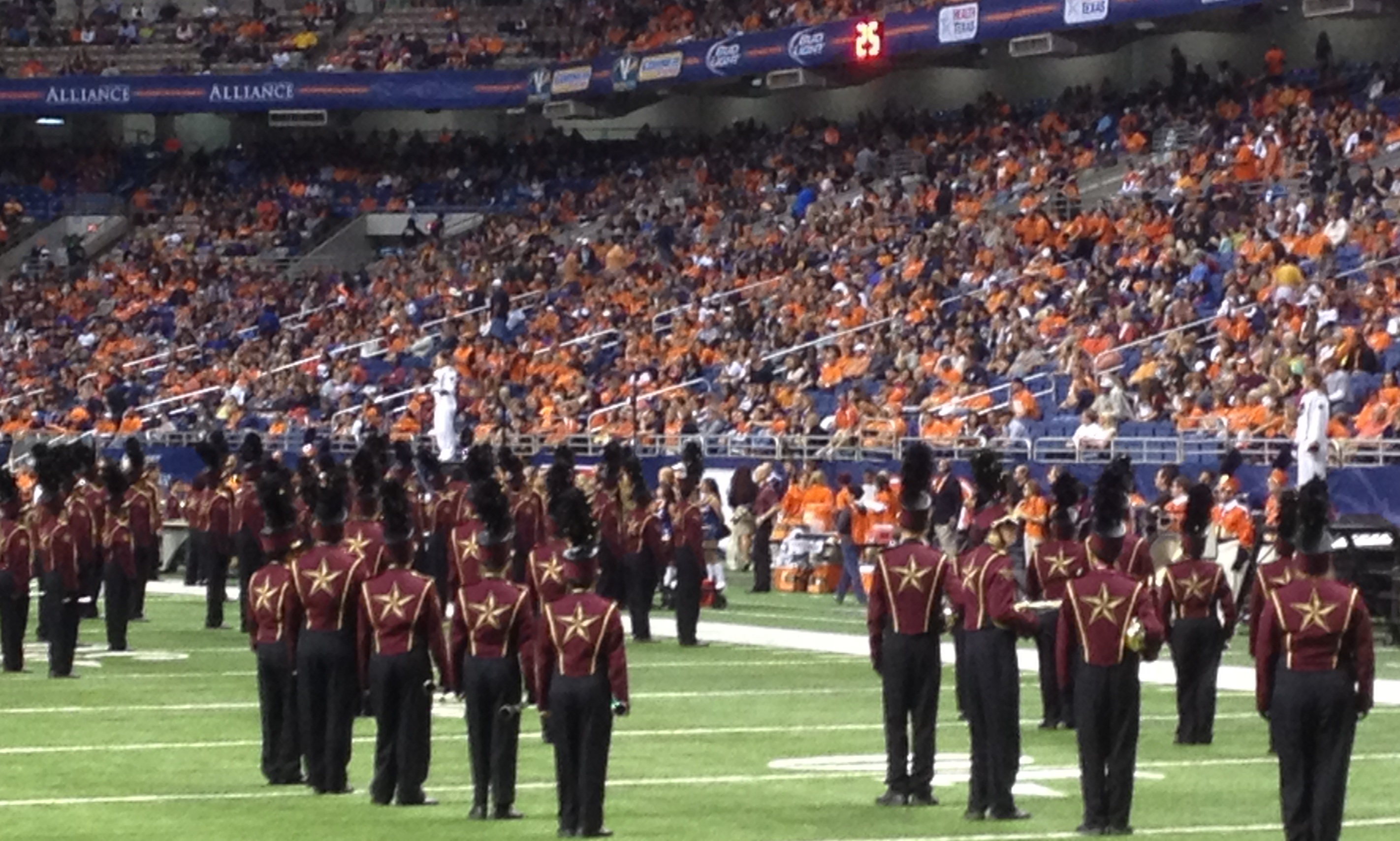
The Texas State Bobcat Marching Band performs at the Alamodome during halftime at the inaugural football game against UTSA

In 2003, "Southwest Texas State University" became "Texas State University—San Marcos", a move designed to help propel the school from a regional institution to a recognized, tier one university, a similar direction that UTSA had envisioned for itself. In 2009, the University of Texas at San Antonio was designated as one of seven emerging tier one universities in the state. Texas State was upgraded to emerging tier one university status in January 2012 by the Texas Higher Education Coordinating Board. In 2013, "Texas State University—San Marcos" was renamed to simply "Texas State University", the school's seventh name in the history of its existence. The university's administration saw the new name both as a clarification due to its identity issues and a step away from local identity.

=== Western Athletic Conference (2012) ===
In 2012, big changes to the rivalry occurred. With the addition of both UTSA and Texas State to the Western Athletic Conference (WAC), the two schools met each other for the first time on a football field. The game, which took place on November 24, 2012, was heavily promoted by both teams. 39,032 fans witnessed the rivalry's first-ever football game, the highest attendance of any game on both teams' schedules and the most-attended conference game in the WAC that year. Although the game remained close throughout its duration, UTSA emerged victorious, 38–31, in its home field at the Alamodome. The teams signed contracts with two different conferences that year, with UTSA heading to Conference USA (CUSA) and Texas State going to the Sun Belt Conference (SBC).

=== Future of the rivalry (2013–present) ===
With the Bobcats and Roadrunners parting ways to different conferences in 2013, the fate of the rivalry remained uncertain.

On May 23, 2014, both Texas State and UTSA both announced an eight-game football series starting in 2017 in San Marcos. "With the proximity and similarities that we have, this could develop into a special college football rivalry," stated by the Texas State head coach Dennis Franchione. On January 23, 2020, Texas State and UTSA announced a further extension of the football series to 2031. However, scheduling beyond 2022 was subject to change, as the SBC expanded to 14 members in 2022, and UTSA moved from CUSA to the American Conference (then known as the American Athletic Conference) in 2023, bringing that league to 14 football members. (Note: One full member of the American, Wichita State, does not sponsor football. Wichita State is replaced in the football league by single-sport member Navy. In 2024, Army joined for football only, coinciding with full member SMU departing for the ACC.)

== Game results ==
=== Men's basketball ===
Texas State–UTSA men's basketball rivalry
- First meeting: February 9, 1985; UTSA 83, Texas State 76
- Latest meeting: November 15, 2026; Texas State 87, UTSA 67

Statistics
- Total meetings: 65
- All-time series: UTSA leads 37–28
- Longest win streak: UTSA, 8 (1986–1994)
- Current win streak: Texas State, 3 (2023–present)

| Texas State victories | UTSA victories |

| No. | Date | Location | Winner | Score |
|---|---|---|---|---|
| 1 | February 9, 1985 | San Antonio, TX | UTSA | 83–76 |
| 2 | February 26, 1985 | San Marcos, TX | UTSA | 94–77 |
| 3 | January 11, 1986 | San Marcos | Southwest Texas State | 69–62 |
| 4 | March 6, 1986 | San Antonio | UTSA | 94–73 |
| 5 | December 8, 1989 | Austin, TX | UTSA | 97–78 |
| 6 | November 24, 1990 | San Antonio | UTSA | 132–97 |
| 7 | January 5, 1991 | San Marcos | UTSA | 77–61 |
| 8 | January 25, 1992 | San Marcos | UTSA | 70–68 |
| 9 | February 22, 1992 | San Antonio | UTSA | 82–66 |
| 10 | January 16, 1993 | San Antonio | UTSA | 83–74 |
| 11 | February 13, 1993 | San Marcos | UTSA | 67–65 |
| 12 | January 8, 1994 | San Antonio | Southwest Texas State | 75–66 |
| 13 | February 5, 1994 | San Marcos | Southwest Texas State | 79–62 |
| 14 | January 21, 1995 | San Antonio | UTSA | 69–59 |
| 15 | February 18, 1986 | San Marcos | UTSA | 86–82 |
| 16 | January 27, 1996 | San Antonio | UTSA | 65–42 |
| 17 | February 24, 1996 | San Marcos | UTSA | 75–59 |
| 18 | January 25, 1997 | San Antonio | Southwest Texas State | 100–85 |
| 19 | February 15, 1997 | San Marcos | Southwest Texas State | 86–78 |
| 20 | January 29, 1998 | San Marcos | UTSA | 64–63 |
| 21 | February 26, 1998 | San Antonio | Southwest Texas State | 76–65 |
| 22 | January 23, 1999 | San Marcos | UTSA | 60–56 |
| 23 | February 27, 1999 | San Antonio | Southwest Texas State | 91–77 |
| 24 | March 6, 1999 | Shreveport, LA | UTSA | 71–63 |
| 25 | January 29, 2000 | San Antonio | UTSA | 90–86 |
| 26 | March 4, 2000 | San Marcos | Southwest Texas State | 77–69 |
| 27 | March 7, 2000 | San Antonio | Southwest Texas State | 88–86 |
| 28 | January 27, 2001 | San Antonio | UTSA | 77–69 |
| 29 | February 19, 2001 | San Marcos | UTSA | 90–85 |
| 30 | March 6, 2001 | San Antonio | UTSA | 71–69 |
| 31 | February 16, 2002 | San Antonio | Southwest Texas State | 81–68 |
| 32 | March 2, 2002 | San Marcos | Southwest Texas State | 70–59 |
| 33 | March 4, 2002 | San Antonio | UTSA | 99–83 |

| No. | Date | Location | Winner | Score |
|---|---|---|---|---|
| 34 | January 25, 2003 | San Marcos | Southwest Texas State | 85–76 |
| 35 | February 24, 2003 | San Antonio | UTSA | 83–73 |
| 36 | January 21, 2004 | San Antonio | Texas State | 74–73 |
| 37 | February 25, 2004 | San Marcos | UTSA | 69–66 |
| 38 | March 8, 2004 | San Antonio | UTSA | 78–73 |
| 39 | February 12, 2005 | San Antonio | UTSA | 88–69 |
| 40 | March 4, 2005 | San Antonio | UTSA | 81–76 |
| 41 | February 18, 2006 | San Marcos | Texas State | 85–68 |
| 42 | January 20, 2007 | San Marcos | Texas State | 67–63 |
| 43 | February 17, 2007 | San Antonio | Texas State | 77–65 |
| 44 | January 26, 2008 | San Antonio | Texas State | 79–73 |
| 45 | February 23, 2008 | San Marcos | UTSA | 103–96 |
| 46 | January 28, 2009 | San Antonio | UTSA | 86–76 |
| 47 | March 4, 2009 | San Marcos | Texas State | 80–66 |
| 48 | January 27, 2010 | San Marcos | Texas State | 76–62 |
| 49 | March 3, 2010 | San Antonio | Texas State | 83–76 |
| 50 | January 22, 2011 | San Antonio | UTSA | 88–84 |
| 51 | February 26, 2011 | San Marcos | Texas State | 82–80 |
| 52 | January 21, 2012 | San Marcos | UTSA | 80–75 |
| 53 | February 25, 2012 | San Antonio | Texas State | 66–52 |
| 54 | January 19, 2013 | San Antonio | Texas State | 81–78 |
| 55 | February 16, 2013 | San Marcos | UTSA | 73–62 |
| 56 | November 22, 2014 | San Antonio | UTSA | 80–67 |
| 57 | December 2, 2015 | San Marcos | Texas State | 76–53 |
| 58 | November 25, 2016 | San Antonio | UTSA | 63–48 |
| 59 | November 15, 2017 | San Marcos | UTSA | 79–78 |
| 60 | December 1, 2018 | San Antonio | Texas State | 69–68 |
| 61 | December 7, 2019 | San Marcos | UTSA | 77–71 |
| 62 | November 17, 2022 | San Antonio | UTSA | 61–56 |
| 63 | November 17, 2023 | San Marcos | Texas State | 72–62 |
| 64 | November 12, 2025 | San Marcos | Texas State | 80–69 |
| 65 | November 15, 2026 | San Antonio | Texas State | 87–67 |
Series: UTSA leads 37–28

=== Football ===
Texas State–UTSA football rivalry
- First meeting: November 24, 2012; UTSA 38, Texas State 31
- Latest meeting: September 12, 2026; UTSA 31, Texas State 26
- Next meeting: September 18. 2027

Statistics
- Total meetings: 8
- All-time series: UTSA leads 6–2
- Largest victory: Texas State, 49–10 (2024)
- Longest win streak: UTSA, 5 (2012–2023)
- Current win streak: UTSA, 1 (2026–present)

| Texas State victories | UTSA victories |

| No. | Date | Location | Winner | Score |
|---|---|---|---|---|
| 1 | November 24, 2012 | San Antonio | UTSA | 38–31 |
| 2 | September 23, 2017 | San Marcos | UTSA | 44–14 |
| 3 | September 22, 2018 | San Antonio | UTSA | 25–21 |
| 4 | September 12, 2020 | San Marcos | UTSA | 51–48 |
| 5 | September 9, 2023 | San Antonio | UTSA | 20–13 |
| 6 | September 7, 2024 | San Marcos | Texas State | 49–10 |
| 7 | September 6, 2025 | San Antonio | Texas State | 43–36 |
| 8 | September 12, 2026 | San Marcos | UTSA | 31–26 |
Series: UTSA leads 6–2

== See also ==
- List of NCAA college football rivalry games
