= December 2012 in sports =

| << | December 2012 | | | | | >> |
| Su | Mo | Tu | We | Th | Fr | Sa |
| | | | | | | 1 |
| 2 | 3 | 4 | 5 | 6 | 7 | 8 |
| 9 | 10 | 11 | 12 | 13 | 14 | 15 |
| 16 | 17 | 18 | 19 | 20 | 21 | 22 |
| 23 | 24 | 25 | 26 | 27 | 28 | 29 |
| 30 | 31 |
Sports

This list shows notable sports-related deaths, events, and notable outcomes that occurred in December of 2012.

== Days of the month ==
=== 31 December 2012 (Monday) ===
==== American football ====
- NCAA bowl games (BCS standings in brackets):
  - Music City Bowl in Nashville, Tennessee: Vanderbilt 38, NC State 24.
  - Sun Bowl in El Paso, Texas: Georgia Tech 21, USC 7.
  - Liberty Bowl in Memphis, Tennessee: Tulsa 31, Iowa State 17.
  - Chick-fil-A Bowl in Atlanta, Georgia: [14] Clemson 25, [8] LSU 24.

=== 30 December 2012 (Sunday) ===
==== American football ====
- NFL, Week 17:
  - In Denver, Colorado: Denver Broncos 38, Kansas City Chiefs 3.
    - The Broncos, already won the AFC West title, clinch the conference's No. 1 seed to earn home-field advantage throughout the AFC playoffs and first round bye.
    - The Chiefs finish their season with 2–14 record, and win the right to the first overall pick in the 2013 draft.
  - In Foxborough, Massachusetts: New England Patriots 28, Miami Dolphins 0.
    - The Patriots, winner of the AFC East, get the conference's No. 2 seed and wrap up a first round bye in the AFC playoffs.
  - In Indianapolis, Indiana: Indianapolis Colts 28, Houston Texans 16.
    - With wins by the Broncos and Patriots, the AFC South champion Texans fall to the conference's No. 3 seed and will host the Cincinnati Bengals in the first round of the playoffs.
  - In Cincinnati, Ohio: Cincinnati Bengals 23, Baltimore Ravens 17.
    - The Ravens, the AFC North winner and conference's No. 4 seed, will face off with the Colts in the first round of the playoffs.
  - In San Francisco, California: San Francisco 49ers 27, Arizona Cardinals 13.
    - The 49ers grab the NFC West title, and clinch the conference's No. 2 seed to gain a first round bye in the NFC playoffs.
  - In Minneapolis, Minnesota: Minnesota Vikings 37, Green Bay Packers 34.
    - The NFC North champion Packers fail to get the conference's No. 2 seed as the Vikings secure an NFC Wild Card spot, and they have to contend with each other again in the first round of the playoffs.
  - Sunday Night Football in Landover, Maryland: Washington Redskins 28, Dallas Cowboys 18.
    - The Redskins claim their first NFC East title since 1999, and get the conference's No. 4 seed to host the Seattle Seahawks in the first round of the playoffs.
  - In Detroit, Michigan: Chicago Bears 26, Detroit Lions 24.
    - The Bears' victory eliminates the New York Giants, the reigning Super Bowl champion, from postseason action. Thus for the eighth consecutive year, the Vince Lombardi Trophy will have a new owner who will be crowned the new Super Bowl champion.

==== Cricket ====
- Pakistan in India:
  - 1st ODI in Chennai: India 227/6 (50.0 overs); Pakistan 228/4 (48.1 overs). Pakistan win by 6 wickets; lead 3-match series 1–0.

==== Cross-country skiing ====
- Tour de Ski:
  - Stage 2 in Oberhof, Germany:
    - Men's 15 km Classic Pursuit: (gold) Maxim Vylegzhanin (RUS) (silver) Alexander Legkov (RUS) (bronze) Petter Northug (NOR)
      - Tour de Ski standings (after 2 of 7 races): (1) Vylegzhanin 47:45.7 (2) Legkov +5.1 (3) Northug +16.5
    - Women's 9 km Classic Pursuit: (gold) Justyna Kowalczyk (POL) (silver) Therese Johaug (NOR) (bronze) Anne Kyllönen (FIN)
      - Tour de Ski standings (after 2 of 7 races): (1) Kowalczyk 31:59.5 (2) Johaug +46.4 (3) Kyllönen +55.0

==== Ski jumping ====
- Four Hills Tournament:
  - Stage 1, HS 137 in Oberstdorf, Germany: (gold) Anders Jacobsen (NOR) (silver) Gregor Schlierenzauer (AUT) (bronze) Severin Freund (GER)

=== 29 December 2012 (Saturday) ===
==== Alpine skiing ====
- Men's World Cup:
  - Downhill in Bormio, Italy: (gold) Hannes Reichelt (AUT) and Dominik Paris (ITA) (bronze) Aksel Lund Svindal (NOR)
    - Overall standings (after 14 of 36 races): (1) Svindal 674 points (2) Marcel Hirscher (AUT) 560 (3) Ted Ligety (USA) 537
    - Downhill standings (after 4 of 9 races): (1) Svindal 285 points (2) Paris 193 (3) Klaus Kröll (AUT) 141
- Women's World Cup:
  - Slalom in Semmering, Austria: (gold) Veronika Zuzulová (SVK) (silver) Kathrin Zettel (AUT) (bronze) Tina Maze (SLO)
    - Overall standings (after 16 of 37 races): (1) Maze 1059 points (2) Maria Höfl-Riesch (GER) 632 (3) Zettel 582
    - Slalom standings (after 4 of 11 races): (1) Maze 230 points (2) Höfl-Riesch 224 (3) Zuzulová 205

==== American football ====
- NCAA bowl games (BCS standings in brackets):
  - Armed Forces Bowl in Fort Worth, Texas: Rice 33, Air Force 14.
  - Pinstripe Bowl in Bronx, New York: Syracuse 38, West Virginia 14.
  - Kraft Fight Hunger Bowl in San Francisco, California: Arizona State 62, Navy 28.
  - Alamo Bowl in San Antonio, Texas: [23] Texas 31, [13] Oregon State 27.
  - Buffalo Wild Wings Bowl in Tempe, Arizona: Michigan State 17, TCU 16.

==== Cross-country skiing ====
- Tour de Ski:
  - Stage 1 in Oberhof, Germany:
    - Men's 4.0 km Freestyle Sprint: (gold) Petter Northug (NOR) (silver) Marcus Hellner (SWE) (bronze) Alexander Legkov (RUS)
    - Women's 3.1 km Freestyle Sprint: (gold) Kikkan Randall (USA) (silver) Charlotte Kalla (SWE) (bronze) Justyna Kowalczyk (POL)

==== Mixed martial arts ====
- UFC 155 in Las Vegas, Nevada, United States (USA unless stated):
  - Middleweight bout: Derek Brunson def. Chris Leben via unanimous decision (29–28, 29–28, 29–28)
  - Middleweight bout: Yushin Okami (JPN) def. Alan Belcher via unanimous decision (30–27, 30–27, 29–28)
  - Middleweight bout: Costas Philippou (CYP) def. Tim Boetsch via TKO (punches)
  - Lightweight bout: Jim Miller def. Joe Lauzon via unanimous decision (29–28, 29–28, 29–28)
  - Heavyweight Championship bout: Cain Velasquez def. Junior dos Santos (BRA) (c) via unanimous decision (50–45, 50–43, 50–44)

=== 28 December 2012 (Friday) ===
==== Alpine skiing ====
- Women's World Cup:
  - Giant Slalom in Semmering, Austria: (gold) Anna Fenninger (AUT) (silver) Tina Maze (SLO) (bronze) Tessa Worley (FRA)
    - Overall standings (after 15 of 37 races): (1) Maze 999 points (2) Maria Höfl-Riesch (GER) 582 (3) Kathrin Zettel (AUT) 502
    - Giant Slalom standings (after 6 of 9 races): (1) Maze 540 points (2) Zettel 342 (3) Viktoria Rebensburg (GER) 301

==== American football ====
- NCAA bowl games:
  - Independence Bowl in Shreveport, Louisiana: Ohio 45, Louisiana–Monroe 14.
  - Russell Athletic Bowl in Orlando, Florida: Virginia Tech 13, Rutgers 10 (OT).
  - Meineke Car Care Bowl of Texas in Houston, Texas: Texas Tech 34, Minnesota 31.

==== Cricket ====
- Pakistan in India:
  - 2nd T20I in Ahmedabad: India 192/5 (20.0 overs); Pakistan 181/7 (20.0 overs). India win by 11 runs; 2-match series drawn 1–1.

=== 27 December 2012 (Thursday) ===
==== American football ====
- NCAA bowl games (BCS standings in brackets):
  - Military Bowl in Washington, D.C.: [24] San Jose State 29, Bowling Green 20.
  - Belk Bowl in Charlotte, North Carolina: Cincinnati 48, Duke 34.
  - Holiday Bowl in San Diego: Baylor 49, [17] UCLA 26.

=== 26 December 2012 (Wednesday) ===
==== American football ====
- NCAA bowl games:
  - Little Caesars Pizza Bowl in Detroit: Central Michigan 24, Western Kentucky 21.

=== 25 December 2012 (Tuesday) ===
==== Basketball ====
- NBA Christmas games:
  - In Brooklyn, New York: Boston Celtics 93, Brooklyn Nets 76.
  - In Los Angeles, California: Los Angeles Lakers 100, New York Knicks 94.
  - In Miami, Florida: Miami Heat 103, Oklahoma City Thunder 97.
  - In Chicago, Illinois: Houston Rockets 120, Chicago Bulls 97.
  - In Los Angeles, California: Los Angeles Clippers 112, Denver Nuggets 100.

==== Cricket ====
- Pakistan in India:
  - 1st T20I in Bangalore: India 133/9 (20.0 overs); Pakistan 134/5 (19.4 overs). Pakistan win by 5 wickets; lead 2-match series 1–0.

=== 24 December 2012 (Monday) ===
==== American football ====
- NCAA bowl games:
  - Hawaii Bowl in Honolulu, Hawaii: SMU 43, Fresno State 10.

=== 23 December 2012 (Sunday) ===
==== American football ====
- NFL, Week 16:
  - In Kansas City, Missouri: Indianapolis Colts 20, Kansas City Chiefs 13.
    - The Colts secure an AFC Wild Card spot, and advance to the first round of the playoffs.
  - In Pittsburgh, Pennsylvania: Cincinnati Bengals 13, Pittsburgh Steelers 10.
    - The Bengals also secure an AFC Wild Card spot, and advance to the first round of the playoffs.
  - In Houston, Texas: Minnesota Vikings 23, Houston Texans 6.
    - The Vikings' victory eliminates the New Orleans Saints, the host team for Super Bowl XLVII, from postseason action and fail to reverse the Home Field Curse.

=== 22 December 2012 (Saturday) ===
==== American football ====
- NFL, Week 16:
  - Monday Night Football in Detroit, Michigan: Atlanta Falcons 31, Detroit Lions 18.
    - The Falcons, already won the NFC South title, clinch the conference's No. 1 seed to earn home-field advantage throughout the NFC playoffs and first round bye.
    - Despite losing the game, Lions wide receiver Calvin Johnson breaks NFL's single-season receiving yardage record, that has been held by Jerry Rice who gained 1,848 yards in 1995.
- NCAA bowl games (BCS standings in brackets):
  - New Orleans Bowl in New Orleans, Louisiana: Louisiana–Lafayette 43, East Carolina 34.
  - Maaco Bowl Las Vegas in Whitney, Nevada: [19] Boise State 28, Washington 26.

=== 21 December 2012 (Friday) ===
==== American football ====
- NCAA bowl games:
  - Beef 'O' Brady's Bowl in St. Petersburg, Florida: UCF 38, Ball State 17.

=== 20 December 2012 (Thursday) ===
==== Alpine skiing ====
- Women's World Cup:
  - Slalom in Åre, Sweden: (gold) Mikaela Shiffrin (USA) (silver) Frida Hansdotter (SWE) (bronze) Tina Maze (SLO)
    - Overall standings (after 14 of 37 races): (1) Maze 919 points (2) Maria Höfl-Riesch (GER) 532 (3) Kathrin Zettel (AUT) 466
    - Slalom standings (after 3 of 11 races): (1) Shiffrin 196 points (2) Höfl-Riesch 174 (3) Maze 170

==== American football ====
- NCAA bowl games:
  - Poinsettia Bowl in San Diego, California: BYU 23, San Diego State 6.

=== 19 December 2012 (Wednesday) ===
==== Alpine skiing ====
- Women's World Cup:
  - Giant Slalom in Åre, Sweden: (gold) Viktoria Rebensburg (GER) (silver) Anna Fenninger (AUT) (bronze) Tina Maze (SLO)
    - Overall standings (after 13 of 37 races): (1) Maze 859 points (2) Maria Höfl-Riesch (GER) 508 (3) Kathrin Zettel (AUT) 466
    - Giant Slalom standings (after 5 of 9 races): (1) Maze 460 points (2) Zettel 306 (3) Rebensburg 256

=== 18 December 2012 (Tuesday) ===
==== Alpine skiing ====
- Men's World Cup:
  - Slalom in Madonna di Campiglio, Italy: (gold) Marcel Hirscher (AUT) (silver) Felix Neureuther (GER) (bronze) Naoki Yuasa (JPN)
    - Overall standings (after 13 of 36 races): (1) Aksel Lund Svindal (NOR) 614 points (2) Hirscher 560 (3) Ted Ligety (USA) 537
    - Slalom standings (after 3 of 11 races): (1) Hirscher 240 points (2) André Myhrer (SWE) 200 (3) Neureuther 196

=== 16 December 2012 (Sunday) ===
==== Alpine skiing ====
- Men's World Cup:
  - Giant Slalom in Alta Badia, Italy: (gold) Ted Ligety (USA) (silver) Marcel Hirscher (AUT) (bronze) Thomas Fanara (FRA)
    - Overall standings (after 12 of 36 races): (1) Aksel Lund Svindal (NOR) 614 points (2) Ligety 508 (3) Hirscher 460
    - Giant Slalom standings (after 4 of 8 races): (1) Ligety 360 points (2) Hirscher 320 (3) Manfred Mölgg (ITA) 162
- Women's World Cup:
  - Giant Slalom in Courchevel, France: (gold) Tina Maze (SLO) (silver) Kathrin Zettel (AUT) (bronze) Tessa Worley (FRA)
    - Overall standings (after 12 of 37 races): (1) Maze 799 points (2) Maria Höfl-Riesch (GER) 468 (3) Zettel 440
    - Giant Slalom standings (after 4 of 9 races): (1) Maze 400 points (2) Zettel 280 (3) Worley 160

==== American football ====
- NFL, Week 15:
  - Bills Toronto Series in Toronto, Canada: Seattle Seahawks 50, Buffalo Bills 17.
    - Seahawks become the third team in NFL history to score more than 50 points in consecutive games of the same season, joining the Los Angeles Rams and New York Giants, both in 1950.

==== Baseball ====
- Australian Baseball League All-Star Game in Melbourne: Team Australia 6, World All-Stars 4.

==== Nordic combined ====
- World Cup:
  - HS 98 / 10 km in Ramsau, Austria: (gold) Mikko Kokslien (NOR) (silver) Jason Lamy-Chappuis (FRA) (bronze) Mario Stecher (AUT)
    - Standings (after 5 of 17 races): (1) Lamy-Chappuis 355 points (2) Magnus Moan (NOR) 323 (3) Bernhard Gruber (AUT) 200

=== 15 December 2012 (Saturday) ===
==== Alpine skiing ====
- Men's World Cup:
  - Downhill in Val Gardena, Italy: (gold) Steven Nyman (USA) (silver) Rok Perko (SLO) (bronze) Erik Guay (CAN)
    - Overall standings (after 11 of 36 races): (1) Aksel Lund Svindal (NOR) 585 points (2) Ted Ligety (USA) 408 (3) Marcel Hirscher (AUT) 380
    - Downhill standings (after 3 of 9 races): (1) Svindal 225 points (2) Kjetil Jansrud (NOR) 139 (3) Guay 116
- Women's World Cup:
  - Super Giant Slalom in Val-d'Isère, France: Cancelled due to heavy snow.

==== American football ====
- NCAA bowl games (BCS standings in brackets):
  - New Mexico Bowl in Albuquerque, New Mexico: Arizona 49, Nevada 48.
  - Famous Idaho Potato Bowl in Boise, Idaho: [22] Utah State 41, Toledo 15.

==== Mixed martial arts ====
- UFC on FX: Sotiropoulos vs. Pearson in Gold Coast, Australia:
  - Middleweight bout: Hector Lombard (CUB) def. Rousimar Palhares (BRA) via TKO (punches)
  - Lightweight bout: Norman Parke (NIR) def. Colin Fletcher (ENG) via unanimous decision (30–27, 29–28, 29–28)
  - Welterweight bout: Robert Whittaker (AUS) def. Brad Scott (ENG) via unanimous decision (29–28, 29–28, 29–28)
  - Lightweight bout: Ross Pearson (ENG) def. George Sotiropoulos (AUS) via TKO (punches)
- The Ultimate Fighter: Team Carwin vs. Team Nelson Finale in Las Vegas, Nevada, United States (USA unless stated):
  - Featherweight bout: Dustin Poirier def. Jonathan Brookins via submission (d'arce choke)
  - Heavyweight bout: Pat Barry def. Shane del Rosario via KO (punches)
  - Welterweight bout: Colton Smith def. Mike Ricci (CAN) via unanimous decision (30–27, 30–27, 30–26)
  - Heavyweight bout: Roy Nelson def. Matt Mitrione via TKO (punches)

==== Nordic combined ====
- World Cup:
  - HS 98 / 10 km in Ramsau, Austria: (gold) Magnus Moan (NOR) (silver) Mikko Kokslien (NOR) (bronze) Fabian Riessle (GER)
    - Standings (after 4 of 17 races): (1) Moan 313 points (2) Jason Lamy-Chappuis (FRA) 275 (3) Bernhard Gruber (AUT) 168

=== 14 December 2012 (Friday) ===
==== Alpine skiing ====
- Men's World Cup:
  - Super Giant Slalom in Val Gardena, Italy: (gold) Aksel Lund Svindal (NOR) (silver) Matteo Marsaglia (ITA) (bronze) Werner Heel (ITA)
    - Overall standings (after 10 of 36 races): (1) Svindal 540 points (2) Ted Ligety (USA) 408 (3) Marcel Hirscher (AUT) 380
    - Super Giant Slalom standings (after 3 of 6 races): (1) Svindal 280 points (2) Marsaglia 209 (3) Heel 150
- Women's World Cup:
  - Downhill in Val-d'Isère, France: (gold) Lara Gut (SUI) (silver) Leanne Smith (USA) (bronze) Nadja Kamer (SUI)
    - Overall standings (after 11 of 37 races): (1) Tina Maze (SLO) 699 points (2) Maria Höfl-Riesch (GER) 463 (3) Lindsey Vonn (USA) 414
    - Downhill standings (after 3 of 8 races): (1) Vonn 200 points (2) Stacey Cook (USA) 186 (3) Gut 124

=== 9 December 2012 (Sunday) ===
==== Alpine skiing ====
- Men's World Cup:
  - Giant Slalom in Val-d'Isère, France: (gold) Marcel Hirscher (AUT) (silver) Stefan Luitz (GER) (bronze) Ted Ligety (USA)
    - Overall standings (after 9 of 36 races): (1) Aksel Lund Svindal (NOR) 440 points (2) Ligety 402 (3) Hirscher 380
    - Giant Slalom standings (after 3 of 8 races): (1) Ligety 260 points (2) Hirscher 240 (3) Manfred Mölgg (ITA) 150
- Women's World Cup:
  - Giant Slalom in St. Moritz, Switzerland: (gold) Tina Maze (SLO) (silver) Viktoria Rebensburg (GER) (bronze) Tessa Worley (FRA)
    - Overall standings (after 10 of 37 races): (1) Maze 677 points (2) Maria Höfl-Riesch (GER) 443 (3) Lindsey Vonn (USA) 414
    - Giant Slalom standings (after 3 of 9 races): (1) Maze 300 points (2) Kathrin Zettel (AUT) 200 (3) Rebensburg 140

=== 8 December 2012 (Saturday) ===
==== Alpine skiing ====
- Men's World Cup:
  - Slalom in Val-d'Isère, France: (gold) Alexis Pinturault (FRA) (silver) Felix Neureuther (GER) (bronze) Marcel Hirscher (AUT)
    - Overall standings (after 8 of 36 races): (1) Aksel Lund Svindal (NOR) 400 points (2) Ted Ligety (USA) 342 (3) Hirscher 280
    - Slalom standings (after 2 of 11 races): (1) André Myhrer (SWE) 150 points (2) Hirscher 140 (3) Neureuther 116
- Women's World Cup:
  - Super Giant Slalom in St. Moritz, Switzerland: (gold) Lindsey Vonn (USA) (silver) Tina Maze (SLO) (bronze) Julia Mancuso (USA)
    - Overall standings (after 9 of 37 races): (1) Maze 577 points (2) Maria Höfl-Riesch (GER) 414 (3) Vonn 410
    - Super Giant Slalom standings (after 2 of 7 races): (1) Vonn 200 points (2) Mancuso 140 (3) Maze 130

==== American football ====
- NCAA Division I FBS:
  - Army–Navy Game in Philadelphia, Pennsylvania: Navy 17, Army 13.

==== Mixed martial arts ====
- UFC on Fox: Henderson vs. Diaz in Seattle, Washington, United States (USA unless stated):
  - Welterweight bout: Matt Brown def. Mike Swick via KO (punches)
  - Welterweight bout: Rory MacDonald (CAN) def. B.J. Penn via unanimous decision (30–26, 30–26, 30–27)
  - Light Heavyweight bout: Alexander Gustafsson (SWE) def. Maurício Rua (BRA) via unanimous decision (30–27, 30–27, 30–26)
  - Lightweight Championship bout: Benson Henderson (c) def. Nate Diaz via unanimous decision (50–43, 50–45, 50–45)

=== 7 December 2012 (Friday) ===
==== Alpine skiing ====
- Women's World Cup:
  - Super Combined in St. Moritz, Switzerland: (gold) Tina Maze (SLO) (silver) Nicole Hosp (AUT) (bronze) Kathrin Zettel (AUT)
    - Overall standings (after 8 of 37 races): (1) Maze 497 points (2) Maria Höfl-Riesch (GER) 369 (3) Zettel 320

=== 6 December 2012 (Thursday) ===
==== Rugby union ====
- The Varsity Match in London, England: Oxford University 26–19 Cambridge University

=== 5 December 2012 (Wednesday) ===
==== Basketball ====
- NBA:
  - In New Orleans, Louisiana: Los Angeles Lakers 103, New Orleans Hornets 87.
    - Lakers guard Kobe Bryant becomes the fifth and youngest player in NBA history to score 30,000 career points.

=== 2 December 2012 (Sunday) ===
==== Alpine skiing ====
- Men's World Cup:
  - Giant Slalom in Beaver Creek, United States: (gold) Ted Ligety (USA) (silver) Marcel Hirscher (AUT) (bronze) Davide Simoncelli (ITA)
    - Overall standings (after 7 of 36 races): (1) Aksel Lund Svindal (NOR) 400 points (2) Ligety 320 (3) Hirscher 220
    - Giant Slalom standings (after 2 of 8 races): (1) Ligety 200 points (2) Hirscher 140 (3) Manfred Mölgg (ITA) 130
- Women's World Cup:
  - Super Giant Slalom in Lake Louise, Canada: (gold) Lindsey Vonn (USA) (silver) Julia Mancuso (USA) (bronze) Anna Fenninger (AUT)
    - Overall standings (after 7 of 37 races): (1) Tina Maze (SLO) 397 points (2) Maria Höfl-Riesch (GER) 319 (3) Vonn 310

==== Nordic combined ====
- World Cup:
  - HS 142 / Team sprint in Kuusamo, Finland: (gold) Bernhard Gruber/Mario Stecher (AUT) (silver) Håvard Klemetsen/Mikko Kokslien (NOR) (bronze) Sébastien Lacroix/Jason Lamy-Chappuis (FRA)

=== 1 December 2012 (Saturday) ===
==== Alpine skiing ====
- Men's World Cup:
  - Super Giant Slalom in Beaver Creek, United States: (gold) Matteo Marsaglia (ITA) (silver) Aksel Lund Svindal (NOR) (bronze) Hannes Reichelt (AUT)
    - Overall standings (after 6 of 36 races): (1) Svindal 360 points (2) Ted Ligety (USA) 220 (3) Kjetil Jansrud (NOR) 159
    - Super Giant Slalom standings (after 2 of 6 races): (1) Svindal 180 points (2) Marsaglia 129 (3) Ligety 100
- Women's World Cup:
  - Downhill in Lake Louise, Canada: (gold) Lindsey Vonn (USA) (silver) Stacey Cook (USA) (bronze) Marianne Kaufmann-Abderhalden (SUI)
    - Overall standings (after 6 of 37 races): (1) Tina Maze (SLO) 347 points (2) Maria Höfl-Riesch (GER) 274 (3) Kathrin Zettel (AUT) 260
    - Downhill standings (after 2 of 8 races): (1) Vonn 200 points (2) Cook 160 (3) Höfl-Riesch 100

==== American football ====
- NCAA Division I FBS (BCS standings in brackets):
  - Conference championship games:
    - C-USA Championship Game in Tulsa, Oklahoma: Tulsa 33, UCF 27 (OT).
    - SEC Championship Game in Atlanta, Georgia: [2] Alabama 32, [3] Georgia 28.
      - Alabama advances to the BCS National Championship Game against [1] Notre Dame.
    - ACC Championship Game in Charlotte, North Carolina: [13] Florida State 21, Georgia Tech 15.
    - Big Ten Championship Game in Indianapolis, Indiana: Wisconsin 70, [12] Nebraska 31.
  - Other games:
    - In Fort Worth, Texas: [11] Oklahoma 24, TCU 17.
    - In Manhattan, Kansas: [6] Kansas State 42, [18] Texas 24.
      - Oklahoma and Kansas State claim a share of the Big 12 championship, with Kansas State winning the tiebreaker for the BCS berth.
    - In East Hartford, Connecticut: Cincinnati 34, Connecticut 17.
      - Cincinnati shares the Big East title with Louisville, Rutgers and Syracuse.
    - In Reno, Nevada: [20] Boise State 27, Nevada 21.
      - Boise State shares the MWC title with Fresno State and San Diego State.
    - In Jonesboro, Arkansas: Arkansas State 45, Middle Tennessee 0.
      - Arkansas State wins the Sun Belt championship for the second consecutive year.

==== Nordic combined ====
- World Cup:
  - HS 142 / 10 km in Kuusamo, Finland: (gold) Jason Lamy-Chappuis (FRA) (silver) Magnus Krog (NOR) (bronze) Sébastien Lacroix (FRA)
    - Standings (after 3 of 17 races): (1) Lamy-Chappuis 230 points (2) Magnus Moan (NOR) 213 (3) Håvard Klemetsen (NOR) 141

==== Rugby union ====
- End of year tests, Week 5:
  - In London, England: England 38–21 New Zealand
  - In Cardiff, Wales: Wales 12–14 Australia
