= January 2013 in sports =

<<	January 2013					>>
Su	Mo	Tu	We	Th	Fr	Sa
		1	2	3	4	5
6	7	8	9	10	11	12
13	14	15	16	17	18	19
20	21	22	23	24	25	26
27	28	29	30	31
Sports

This list shows notable sports-related events and notable outcomes that occurred in January 2013.

== Days of the month ==
=== 31 January 2013 (Thursday) ===
==== Bicycle racing ====
- Road bicycle racing:
  - 3rd stage Ladies Tour of Qatar in Qatar:
    - 1. Kirsten Wild (Netherlands)
    - 2. Ellen van Dijk (Netherlands)
    - 3. Giorgia Bronzini (Italy)

=== 30 January 2013 (Wednesday) ===
==== Bicycle racing ====
- Road bicycle racing:
  - 2nd stage Ladies Tour of Qatar in Qatar:
    - 1. Kirsten Wild (Netherlands)
    - 2. Trixi Worrack (Germany)
    - 3. Ellen van Dijk (Netherlands)

=== 29 January 2013 (Tuesday) ===
==== Bicycle racing ====
- Road bicycle racing:
  - 1st stage Ladies Tour of Qatar in Qatar:
    - 1. Chloe Hosking (Australia)
    - 2. Gracie Elvin (Australia)
    - 3. Lisa Brennauer (Germany)

=== 27 January 2013 (Sunday) ===
==== Auto racing ====
- Sports cars endurance racing:
  - 24 Hours of Daytona in Daytona Beach, Florida, United States:
    - 1. Charlie Kimball (United States) Juan Pablo Montoya (Colombia) Scott Pruett (United States) Memo Rojas (Mexico)
    - 2. Max Angelelli (Italy) Ryan Hunter-Reay (United States) Jordan Taylor (United States)
    - 3. A. J. Allmendinger (United States) Marcos Ambrose (Australia) Oswaldo Negri (Brazil) John Pew (United States) Justin Wilson (United Kingdom)

=== 26 January 2013 (Saturday) ===
==== American football ====
- NCAA bowl games
  - 2013 Senior Bowl
    - In Mobile, Alabama: South 21, North 16
      - In the concluding game of the college football post-season, Florida State's EJ Manuel led the South all-star squad to a victory. His contributions included a touchdown and rushing on the South team's initial two drives.

=== 22 January 2013 (Tuesday) ===
==== Ice hockey ====
- NHL regular season:
  - In Raleigh, North Carolina: Tampa Bay Lightning 4, Carolina Hurricanes 1.
  - In Washington, D.C.: Winnipeg Jets 4, Washington Capitals 2.
  - In Newark, New Jersey: New Jersey Devils 3, Philadelphia Flyers 0.
  - In Montreal, Quebec: Montreal Canadiens 4, Florida Panthers 1.
  - In Detroit, Michigan: Dallas Stars 2, Detroit Red Wings 1.
  - In St. Paul, Minnesota: Nashville Predators 3, Minnesota Wild 1.

=== 21 January 2013 (Monday) ===
==== Handball ====
- World Men's Handball Championship in Spain:
  - Round of 16:
    - In Barcelona:
      - Slovenia 31–26 Egypt
      - Hungary 27–19 Poland
    - In Zaragoza:
      - Serbia 20–31 Spain
      - Croatia 33–24 Belarus
  - 17–20th place semifinals in Guadalajara:
    - Argentina 30–26 Qatar
    - Saudi Arabia 24–28 Algeria
  - 21–24th place semifinals in Guadalajara:
    - Montenegro 35–31 Chile
    - South Korea 36–14 Australia

==== Ice hockey ====
- NHL regular season:
  - In Uniondale, New York: New York Islanders 4, Tampa Bay Lightning 3.
  - In Boston, Massachusetts: Boston Bruins 2, Winnipeg Jets 1 (SO)
  - In Nashville, Tennessee: St. Louis Blues 4, Nashville Predators 3.
  - In Toronto, Ontario: Buffalo Sabres 2, Toronto Maple Leafs 1.
  - In Kanata, Ontario: Ottawa Senators 4, Florida Panthers 0.
  - In Columbus, Ohio: Detroit Red Wings 4, Columbus Blue Jackets 3.
  - In Calgary, Alberta: Anaheim Ducks 5, Calgary Flames 4.

=== 20 January 2013 (Sunday) ===
==== Alpine skiing ====
- Men's World Cup:
  - Slalom in Wengen, Switzerland: (gold) Felix Neureuther (GER) (silver) Marcel Hirscher (AUT) (bronze) Ivica Kostelić (CRO)
    - Overall standings (after 21 of 36 races): (1) Hirscher 935 points (2) Aksel Lund Svindal (NOR) 747 (3) Ted Ligety (USA) 696
    - Slalom standings (after 7 of 11 races): (1) Hirscher 600 points (2) Neureuther 486 (3) André Myhrer (SWE) 330
- Women's World Cup:
  - Super Giant Slalom in Cortina d'Ampezzo, Italy: (gold) Viktoria Rebensburg (GER) (silver) Nicole Schmidhofer (AUT) (bronze) Tina Maze (SLO)
    - Overall standings (after 23 of 37 races): (1) Maze 1474 points (2) Maria Höfl-Riesch (GER) 756 (3) Anna Fenninger (AUT) 644
    - Super Giant Slalom standings (after 4 of 7 races): (1) Maze 290 points (2) Lindsey Vonn (USA) 286 (3) Julia Mancuso (USA) 225

==== Curling ====
- Women's World Curling Tour:
  - Glynhill Ladies International final in Glasgow, Scotland: Binia Feltscher (SUI) 8–1 Heather Nedohin (CAN)
- The Dominion All-Star Skins Game in Rama, Ontario:
  - Final: Team Glenn Howard $22,000–$20,000 Team Kevin Koe
- British Columbia Scotties Tournament of Hearts in Cloverdale, British Columbia:
  - Final: Kelly Scott (Kelowna) 9–6 Patti Knezevic (Prince George)
    - Scott will represent British Columbia at the Scotties Tournament of Hearts.

==== Handball ====
- World Men's Handball Championship in Spain:
  - Round of 16:
    - In Barcelona:
      - Germany 28–23 North Macedonia
      - Iceland 28–30 France
    - In Zaragoza:
      - Brazil 26–27 Russia
      - Denmark 30–23 Tunisia

==== Ice hockey ====
- NHL regular season:
  - In Buffalo, New York: Buffalo Sabres 5, Philadelphia Flyers 2.
  - In Calgary, Alberta: San Jose Sharks 4, Calgary Flames 1.
  - In New York: Pittsburgh Penguins 6, New York Rangers 3.
  - In St. Paul, Minnesota: Minnesota Wild 1, Dallas Stars 0.
  - In Vancouver, British Columbia: Edmonton Oilers 3, Vancouver Canucks 2 (SO).
  - In Glendale, Arizona: Chicago Blackhawks 6, Phoenix Coyotes 4.

==== Nordic combined ====
- World Cup:
  - HS 109 / 10 km in Seefeld, Austria: (gold) Eric Frenzel (GER) (silver) Mikko Kokslien (NOR) (bronze) Taylor Fletcher (USA)
    - Standings (after 9 of 17 races): (1) Jason Lamy-Chappuis (FRA) 527 points (2) Magnus Moan (NOR) 508 (3) Frenzel 474

==== Rugby union ====
- Top League playoffs:
  - Semifinals in Tokyo: Panasonic Wild Knights 8–20 Toshiba Brave Lupus

=== 19 January 2013 (Saturday) ===
==== Alpine skiing ====
- Men's World Cup:
  - Downhill in Wengen, Switzerland: (gold) Christof Innerhofer (ITA) (silver) Klaus Kröll (AUT) (bronze) Hannes Reichelt (AUT)
    - Overall standings (after 20 of 36 races): (1) Marcel Hirscher (AUT) 855 points (2) Aksel Lund Svindal (NOR) 747 (3) Ted Ligety (USA) 676
    - Downhill standings (after 5 of 9 races): (1) Svindal 285 points (2) Innerhofer 233 (3) Kröll 221
- Women's World Cup:
  - Downhill in Cortina d'Ampezzo, Italy: (gold) Lindsey Vonn (USA) (silver) Tina Maze (SLO) (bronze) Leanne Smith (USA)
    - Overall standings (after 22 of 37 races): (1) Maze 1414 points (2) Maria Höfl-Riesch (GER) 744 (3) Anna Fenninger (AUT) 630
    - Downhill standings (after 5 of 8 races): (1) Vonn 340 points (2) Stacey Cook (USA) 211 (3) Maze 189

==== Curling ====
- The Dominion All-Star Skins Game, semifinals in Rama, Ontario:
  - Team Kevin Koe $17,500–$3,500 Team Jeff Stoughton
  - Team Glenn Howard $14,500–$6,500 Team Kevin Martin
- Newfoundland and Labrador Scotties Tournament of Hearts in St. John's, Newfoundland and Labrador:
  - Final #2: Stacie Devereaux (Bally Haly) 8–7 Heather Strong (Bally Haly)
    - Devereaux will represent Newfoundland and Labrador at the Scotties Tournament of Hearts.

==== Handball ====
- World Men's Handball Championship in Spain (teams in **bold** advance to the main round):
  - Group C in Zaragoza:
    - **Belarus** 33–15 Saudi Arabia
    - **Poland** 33–25 South Korea
    - **Serbia** 31–33 **Slovenia**
      - Final standings: Slovenia 10 points, Poland 8, Serbia 6, Belarus 4, Saudi Arabia 2, South Korea 0.
  - Group D in Madrid:
    - **Egypt** 39–14 Australia
    - **Spain** 25–27 **Croatia**
    - **Hungary** 29–26 Algeria
      - Final standings: Croatia 10 points, Spain 8, Hungary 6, Egypt, Algeria 3, Australia 0.

==== Ice hockey ====
- NHL season opening day:
  - In Philadelphia, Pennsylvania: Pittsburgh Penguins 3, Philadelphia Flyers 1.
  - In Winnipeg, Manitoba: Ottawa Senators 4, Winnipeg Jets 1.
  - In Los Angeles, California: Chicago Blackhawks 5, Los Angeles Kings 2.
  - In Boston, Massachusetts: Boston Bruins 3, New York Rangers 1.
  - In Montreal, Quebec: Toronto Maple Leafs 2, Montreal Canadiens 1.
  - In Uniondale, New York: New Jersey Devils 2, New York Islanders 1.
  - In Tampa, Florida: Tampa Bay Lightning 6, Washington Capitals 3.
  - In Sunrise, Florida: Florida Panthers 5, Carolina Hurricanes 1.
  - In St. Louis, Missouri: St. Louis Blues 6, Detroit Red Wings 0.
  - In Nashville, Tennessee: Columbus Blue Jackets 3, Nashville Predators 2 (SO).
  - In Dallas, Texas: Dallas Stars 4, Phoenix Coyotes 3.
  - In St. Paul, Minnesota: Minnesota Wild 4, Colorado Avalanche 2.
  - In Vancouver, British Columbia: Anaheim Ducks 7, Vancouver Canucks 3.

==== Mixed martial arts ====
- UFC on FX: Belfort vs. Bisping in São Paulo, Brazil:
  - Lightweight bout: **Khabib Nurmagomedov** (RUS) def. Thiago Tavares (BRA) via KO (elbows)
  - Heavyweight bout: **Gabriel Gonzaga** (BRA) def. Ben Rothwell (USA) via submission (guillotine choke)
  - Middleweight bout: **CB Dollaway** (USA) def. Daniel Sarafian (BRA) via split decision (29–28, 28–29, 29–28)
  - Middleweight bout: **Vitor Belfort** (BRA) def. Michael Bisping (ENG) via TKO (head kick and punches)

==== Nordic combined ====
- World Cup:
  - HS 109 / 10 km in Seefeld, Austria: (gold) Eric Frenzel (GER) (silver) Magnus Moan (NOR) (bronze) Tino Edelmann (GER)
    - Standings (after 8 of 17 races): (1) Jason Lamy-Chappuis (FRA) 511 points (2) Moan 468 (3) Frenzel 374

==== Rugby union ====
- Top League playoffs:
  - Semifinals in Tokyo: Suntory Sungoliath 38–19 Kobelco Steelers

=== 18 January 2013 (Friday) ===
==== Alpine skiing ====
- Men's World Cup:
  - Super Combined in Wengen, Switzerland: (gold) Alexis Pinturault (FRA) (silver) Ivica Kostelić (CRO) (bronze) Carlo Janka (SUI)
    - Overall standings (after 19 of 36 races): (1) Marcel Hirscher (AUT) 855 points (2) Aksel Lund Svindal (NOR) 747 (3) Ted Ligety (USA) 676

==== Handball ====
- World Men's Handball Championship in Spain (teams in **bold** advance to the main round):
  - Group A in Barcelona:
    - Argentina 18–22 **Tunisia**
    - **France** 30–32 **Germany**
    - Montenegro 25–26 **Brazil**
      - Final standings: Germany, France 8 points, Brazil, Tunisia 6, Argentina 2, Montenegro 0.
  - Group B in Seville:
    - **Russia** 36–24 Chile
    - **Iceland** 39–29 Qatar
    - **Denmark** 33–30 **North Macedonia**
      - Final standings: Denmark 10 points, Russia 7, Iceland 6, Macedonia 5, Qatar 2, Chile 0.

=== 17 January 2013 (Thursday) ===
==== Handball ====
- World Men's Handball Championship in Spain (teams in **bold** advance to the main round):
  - Group C in Zaragoza:
    - **Slovenia** 27–26 Belarus
    - Saudi Arabia 24–22 South Korea
    - **Poland** 25–24 **Serbia**
      - Standings (after 4 games): Slovenia 8 points, Poland, Serbia 6, Belarus, Saudi Arabia 2, South Korea 0.
  - Group D in Madrid:
    - Australia 15–39 Algeria
    - **Hungary** 22–28 **Spain**
    - **Croatia** 24–20 Egypt
      - Standings (after 4 games): Spain, Croatia 8 points, Hungary 4, Algeria 3, Egypt 1, Australia 0.

=== 16 January 2013 (Wednesday) ===
==== Basketball ====
- NBA:
  - In Oakland, California: Miami Heat 92, Golden State Warriors 75.
    - Heat forward LeBron James becomes the youngest player in NBA history to score 20,000 career points.
- PBA Philippine Cup Finals:
  - Game 4 in Quezon City, Philippines: Talk 'N Text Tropang Texters 105, Rain or Shine Elasto Painters 82. **Talk 'N Text win series 4–0.**
    - Talk 'N Text win their third consecutive PBA Philippine Cup, a league record.

==== Curling ====
- Pacific-Asia Junior Championships in Tokoro, Japan:
  - Men's final: China 7–5 South Korea
  - Women's final: Japan 7–4 China

==== Handball ====
- World Men's Handball Championship in Spain (teams in **bold** advance to the main round):
  - Group A in Granollers:
    - **Brazil** 27–22 Tunisia
    - **Germany** 29–21 Montenegro
    - Argentina 23–35 **France**
      - Standings (after 4 games): France 8 points, Germany 6, Tunisia, Brazil 4, Argentina 2, Montenegro 0.
  - Group B in Seville:
    - **North Macedonia** 29–29 **Russia**
    - Chile 23–31 Qatar
    - Iceland 28–36 **Denmark**
      - Standings (after 4 games): Denmark 8 points, Russia, Macedonia 5, Iceland 4, Qatar 2, Chile 0.

=== 15 January 2013 (Tuesday) ===
==== Alpine skiing ====
- Women's World Cup:
  - Slalom in Flachau, Austria: (gold) Mikaela Shiffrin (USA) (silver) Frida Hansdotter (SWE) (bronze) Tanja Poutiainen (FIN)
    - Overall standings (after 21 of 37 races): (1) Tina Maze (SLO) 1334 points (2) Maria Höfl-Riesch (GER) 744 (3) Kathrin Zettel (AUT) 597
    - Slalom standings (after 7 of 11 races): (1) Shiffrin 436 points (2) Maze 355 (3) Veronika Zuzulová (SVK) 305

==== Handball ====
- World Men's Handball Championship in Spain (teams in **bold** advance to the main round):
  - Group A in Granollers:
    - Tunisia 27–25 Montenegro
    - Germany 31–27 Argentina
    - **France** 27–22 Brazil
      - Standings (after 3 games): France 6 points, Tunisia, Germany 4, Brazil, Argentina 2, Montenegro 0.
  - Group B in Seville:
    - Qatar 22–29 Russia
    - North Macedonia 19–23 Iceland
    - **Denmark** 43–24 Chile
      - Standings (after 3 games): Denmark 6 points, Iceland, Russia, Macedonia 4, Qatar, Chile 0.
  - Group C in Zaragoza:
    - South Korea 20–26 Belarus
    - **Serbia** 30–20 Saudi Arabia
    - **Slovenia** 25–24 Poland
      - Standings (after 3 games): Serbia, Slovenia 6 points, Poland 4, Belarus 2, South Korea, Saudi Arabia 0.
  - Group D in Madrid:
    - Algeria 24–24 Egypt
    - **Spain** 51–11 Australia
    - **Croatia** 30–21 Hungary
      - Standings (after 3 games): Spain, Croatia 6 points, Hungary 4, Egypt, Algeria 1, Australia 0.

=== 14 January 2013 (Monday) ===
==== Handball ====
- World Men's Handball Championship in Spain:
  - Group C in Zaragoza:
    - South Korea 27–34 Slovenia
    - Belarus 28–34 Serbia
    - Saudi Arabia 14–28 Poland
      - Standings (after 2 games): Slovenia, Poland, Serbia 4 points, Belarus, South Korea, Saudi Arabia 0.
  - Group D in Madrid:
    - Algeria 20–31 Croatia
    - Egypt 24–29 Spain
    - Australia 13–43 Hungary
      - Standings (after 2 games): Hungary, Croatia, Spain 4 points, Egypt, Algeria, Australia 0.

=== 13 January 2013 (Sunday) ===
==== Alpine skiing ====
- Men's World Cup:
  - Slalom in Adelboden, Switzerland: (gold) Marcel Hirscher (AUT) (silver) Mario Matt (AUT) (bronze) Manfred Mölgg (ITA)
    - Overall standings (after 18 of 36 races): (1) Hirscher 855 points (2) Aksel Lund Svindal (NOR) 729 (3) Ted Ligety (USA) 676
    - Slalom standings (after 6 of 11 races): (1) Hirscher 520 points (2) Felix Neureuther (GER) 386 (3) André Myhrer (SWE) 330
- Women's World Cup:
  - Super Giant Slalom in St. Anton, Austria: (gold) Tina Maze (SLO) (silver) Anna Fenninger (AUT) (bronze) Fabienne Suter (SUI)
    - Overall standings (after 20 of 37 races): (1) Maze 1289 points (2) Maria Höfl-Riesch (GER) 744 (3) Kathrin Zettel (AUT) 597
    - Super Giant Slalom standings (after 3 of 7 races): (1) Lindsey Vonn (USA) 250 points (2) Maze 230 (3) Julia Mancuso (USA) 180

==== American football ====
- NFL playoffs:
  - NFC Divisional playoffs in Atlanta, Georgia: Atlanta Falcons 30, Seattle Seahawks 28.
  - AFC Divisional playoffs in Foxborough, Massachusetts: New England Patriots 41, Houston Texans 28.

==== Basketball ====
- PBA Philippine Cup Finals:
  - Game 3 in Quezon City, Philippines: Talk 'N Text Tropang Texters 89, Rain or Shine Elasto Painters 80. Talk 'N Text lead series 3–0.

==== Curling ====
- Continental Cup of Curling, final day in Penticton, British Columbia: (United States) (Canada) Team North America 37–23 (United Nations) Team World
  - Early draw (Skins)
    - Men's game: Niklas Edin (World) 3½–1½ Heath McCormick (North America)
    - Mixed game: John Morris (North America) 3½–1½ Tom Brewster (World)
    - Women's game: Margaretha Sigfridsson (World) 3–2 Allison Pottinger (North America)
  - Late draw (Skins)
    - Women's game: Jennifer Jones (North America) 4–1 Mirjam Ott (World)
    - Mixed game: Kevin Martin (North America) 3½–1½ Eve Muirhead (World)
    - Men's game: Glenn Howard (North America) 3–2 Thomas Ulsrud (World)
      - North America win the Cup for the fourth time.
- Women's World Curling Tour:
  - International Bernese Ladies Cup final in Bern, Switzerland: Silvana Tirinzoni (SUI) 6–3 Lene Nielsen (DEN)
- Northwest Territories Men's Curling Championship in Fort Smith, Northwest Territories:
  - Jamie Koe (Yellowknife) defeats Greg Skauge (Yellowknife) 4–2 in the final round robin game to clinch the championship. Koe will represent the Yukon/Northwest Territories at the Hortons Brier.
- NWT/Yukon Scotties Tournament of Hearts in Fort Smith, Northwest Territories:
  - Tie breaker (Final): Kerry Galusha (Yellowknife) 10–3 Ashley Green (Yellowknife)
    - Galusha will represent the Yukon/Northwest Territories at the Scotties Tournament of Hearts.

==== Handball ====
- World Men's Handball Championship in Spain:
  - Group A in Granollers:
    - Brazil 24–20 Argentina
    - Tunisia 25–23 Germany
    - Montenegro 20–32 France
      - Standings (after 2 games): France 4 points, Germany, Tunisia, Argentina, Brazil 2, Montenegro 0.
  - Group B in Seville:
    - Chile 22–38 Iceland
    - Qatar 30–34 North Macedonia
    - Russia 27–31 Denmark
      - Standings (after 2 games): Denmark, Macedonia 4 points, Iceland, Russia 2, Qatar, Chile 0.

==== Ice hockey ====
- Kontinental Hockey League All-Star Game in Chelyabinsk, Russia: Team East 18, Team West 11.

==== Nordic combined ====
- World Cup:
  - HS 118 / Team sprint in Chaux-Neuve, France: (gold) Eric Frenzel/Tino Edelmann (GER) (silver) Magnus Moan/Jørgen Graabak (NOR) (bronze) Sébastien Lacroix/Jason Lamy-Chappuis (FRA)

=== 12 January 2013 (Saturday) ===
==== Alpine skiing ====
- Men's World Cup:
  - Giant Slalom in Adelboden, Switzerland: (gold) Ted Ligety (USA) (silver) Fritz Dopfer (GER) (bronze) Felix Neureuther (GER)
    - Overall standings (after 17 of 36 races): (1) Marcel Hirscher (AUT) 755 points (2) Aksel Lund Svindal (NOR) 729 (3) Ligety 652
    - Giant Slalom standings (after 5 of 8 races): (1) Ligety 460 points (2) Hirscher 335 (3) Manfred Mölgg (ITA) 212
- Women's World Cup:
  - Downhill in St. Anton, Austria: (gold) Alice McKennis (USA) (silver) Daniela Merighetti (ITA) (bronze) Anna Fenninger (AUT)
    - Overall standings (after 19 of 37 races): (1) Tina Maze (SLO) 1189 points (2) Maria Höfl-Riesch (GER) 699 (3) Kathrin Zettel (AUT) 597
    - Downhill standings (after 4 of 8 races): (1) Lindsey Vonn (USA) 240 points (2) Stacey Cook (USA) 195 (3) Merighetti 161

==== American football ====
- NFL playoffs:
  - AFC Divisional playoffs in Denver, Colorado: Baltimore Ravens 38, Denver Broncos 35 (2OT).
  - NFC Divisional playoffs in San Francisco: San Francisco 49ers 45, Green Bay Packers 31.

==== Curling ====
- Continental Cup of Curling, day 3 in Penticton, British Columbia: (United States) (Canada) Team North America 19.5–10.5 (United Nations) Team World
  - Mixed doubles competition:
    - Glenn Howard/Natalie Nicholson (North America) 7–6 Greg Drummond/Anna Sloan (World)
    - Brent Laing/Jennifer Jones (North America) 7–5 Torger Nergård/Carmen Küng (World)
    - Heath McCormick/Jessica Mair (North America) 9–3 Sebastian Kraupp/Maria Prytz (World)
  - Women's team competition:
    - Jennifer Jones (North America) 5–4 Eve Muirhead (World)
    - Margaretha Sigfridsson (World) 5–5 Allison Pottinger (North America)
    - Mirjam Ott (World) 6–2 Heather Nedohin (North America)
  - Men's team competition:
    - Kevin Martin (North America) 8–3 Thomas Ulsrud (World)
    - Heath McCormick (North America) 4–3 Tom Brewster (World)
    - Niklas Edin (World) 5–4 Glenn Howard (North America)

==== Handball ====
- World Men's Handball Championship in Spain:
  - Group A in Granollers:
    - Germany 33–23 Brazil
    - Argentina 28–26 Montenegro
    - France 30–27 Tunisia
  - Group B in Seville:
    - North Macedonia 30–28 Chile
    - Iceland 25–30 Russia
    - Denmark 41–27 Qatar
  - Group C in Zaragoza:
    - Serbia 31–22 South Korea
    - Slovenia 32–22 Saudi Arabia
    - Poland 24–22 Belarus
  - Group D in Madrid:
    - Croatia 36–13 Australia
    - Hungary 32–23 Egypt

==== Mixed martial arts ====
- Strikeforce: Marquardt vs. Saffiedine in Oklahoma City, Oklahoma, United States:
  - Catchweight (194 lb) bout: **Ronaldo Souza** (BRA) def. Ed Herman (USA) via submission (kimura)
  - Light Heavyweight bout: **Gegard Mousasi** (NED) def. Mike Kyle (USA) via submission (rear naked choke)
  - Heavyweight bout: **Josh Barnett** (USA) def. Nandor Guelmino (AUT) via submission (arm triangle choke)
  - Heavyweight bout: **Daniel Cormier** (USA) def. Dion Staring (NED) via TKO (punches)
  - Welterweight Championship bout: **Tarec Saffiedine** (BEL) def. Nate Marquardt (USA) (c) via unanimous decision (48–47, 49–46, 49–46)

==== Nordic combined ====
- World Cup:
  - HS 118 / 10 km in Chaux-Neuve, France: (gold) Tino Edelmann (GER) (silver) Bernhard Gruber (AUT) (bronze) Akito Watabe (JPN)
    - Standings (after 7 of 17 races): (1) Jason Lamy-Chappuis (FRA) 495 points (2) Magnus Moan (NOR) 388 (3) Gruber 304

=== 11 January 2013 (Friday) ===
==== Basketball ====
- PBA Philippine Cup Finals:
  - Game 2 in Pasay, Philippines: Talk 'N Text Tropang Texters 89, Rain or Shine Elasto Painters 81. Talk 'N Text lead series 2–0.

==== Curling ====
- Continental Cup of Curling, day 2 in Penticton, British Columbia: (United States) (Canada) Team North America 13–8 (United Nations) Team World
  - Women's team competition:
    - Margaretha Sigfridsson (World) 4–4 Heather Nedohin (North America)
    - Jennifer Jones (North America) 6–5 Mirjam Ott (World)
    - Allison Pottinger (North America) 9–4 Eve Muirhead (World)
  - Singles competition:
    - Tom Brewster (World) 14–8 Heath McCormick (North America)
    - Glenn Howard (North America) 22–17 Thomas Ulsrud (World)
    - Kevin Martin (North America) 17–13 Niklas Edin (World)
    - Heather Nedohin (North America) 17–11 Eve Muirhead (World)
    - Mirjam Ott (World) 18–11 Jennifer Jones (North America)
    - Allison Pottinger (North America) 18–13 Margaretha Sigfridsson
  - Men's team competition:
    - Tom Brewster (World) 5–5 Glenn Howard (North America)
    - Kevin Martin (North America) 6–3 Niklas Edin (World)
    - Heath McCormick (North America) 8–3 Thomas Ulsrud (World)

==== Handball ====
- World Men's Handball Championship in Spain:
  - Group D in Madrid: Spain 27–14 Algeria

=== 10 January 2013 (Thursday) ===
==== Curling ====
- Continental Cup of Curling, day 1 in Penticton, British Columbia: (United Nations) Team World 5–4 (United States) (Canada) Team North America
  - Women's team competition:
    - Mirjam Ott (World) 9–7 Allison Pottinger (North America)
    - Eve Muirhead (World) 8–3 Heather Nedohin (North America)
    - Margaretha Sigfridsson (World) 6–6 Jennifer Jones (North America)
  - Mixed doubles competition:
    - Christoffer Svae/Carmen Schäfer (World) 8–7 Marc Kennedy/Allison Pottinger (North America)
    - Michael Goodfellow/Eve Muirhead (World) 5–5 Dean Gemmell/Heather Nedohin (North America)
    - John Morris/Kaitlyn Lawes (North America) 10–3 Niklas Edin/Christina Bertrup (World)
  - Men's team competition:
    - Niklas Edin (World) 8–7 Heath McCormick (North America)
    - Glenn Howard (North America) 6–3 Thomas Ulsrud (World)
    - Kevin Martin (North America) 4–3 Tom Brewster (World)

=== 9 January 2013 (Wednesday) ===
==== Basketball ====
- PBA Philippine Cup Finals:
  - Game 1 in Quezon City, Philippines: Talk 'N Text Tropang Texters 87, Rain or Shine Elasto Painters 81. Talk 'N Text lead series 1–0.

=== 8 January 2013 (Tuesday) ===
==== Basketball ====
- NBA:
  - In Houston, Texas: Houston Rockets 125, Los Angeles Lakers 112.
    - Despite losing the game, Lakers guard Steve Nash becomes the fifth player in NBA history to surpass 10,000 career assists.

==== Curling ====
- European Junior Curling Challenge in Prague, Czech Republic:
  - Men's final: Italy 7–6 Denmark
  - Women's final: Denmark 4–1 Hungary

=== 7 January 2013 (Monday) ===
==== American football ====
- NCAA bowl games (BCS standings in brackets):
  - Bowl Championship Series:
    - BCS national championship game in Miami Gardens, Florida: [2] Alabama 42, [1] Notre Dame 14.
      - Alabama wins their third national championship title in four years, defeating the Fighting Irish, the last bowl-eligible undefeated team, and in the process, the Tide successfully defends their unanimous National Championship, having topped both the BCS and AP polls.

=== 6 January 2013 (Sunday) ===
==== Alpine skiing ====
- Men's World Cup:
  - Slalom in Zagreb, Croatia: (gold) Marcel Hirscher (AUT) (silver) André Myhrer (SWE) (bronze) Mario Matt (AUT)
    - Overall standings (after 16 of 36 races): (1) Hirscher 740 points (2) Aksel Lund Svindal (NOR) 689 (3) Ted Ligety (USA) 552
    - Slalom standings (after 5 of 11 races): (1) Hirscher 420 points (2) Felix Neureuther (GER) 341 (3) Myhrer 330

==== American football ====
- NFL playoffs:
  - AFC Wild Card playoffs in Baltimore, Maryland: Baltimore Ravens 24, Indianapolis Colts 9.
  - NFC Wild Card playoffs in Landover, Maryland: Seattle Seahawks 24, Washington Redskins 14.
- NCAA bowl games (BCS standings in brackets):
  - GoDaddy.com Bowl in Mobile, Alabama: Arkansas State 17, [25] Kent State 13.

==== Cricket ====
- Pakistan in India:
  - 3rd ODI in Delhi: India 167 (43.4 overs); Pakistan 157 (48.5 overs). **India win by 10 runs; Pakistan win 3-match series 2–1.**

==== Cross-country skiing ====
- Tour de Ski:
  - Stage 7 in Fiemme Valley, Italy:
    - Men's 9 km Freestyle Final Climb: (gold) Marcus Hellner (SWE) (silver) Ivan Babikov (CAN) (bronze) Roland Clara (ITA)
      - Tour de Ski final standings: (1) Alexander Legkov (RUS) 3:29:28.6 (2) Dario Cologna (SUI) +18.7 (3) Maxim Vylegzhanin (RUS) +40.7
        - Legkov wins his first Tour de Ski title.
    - Women's 9 km Freestyle Final Climb: (gold) Therese Johaug (NOR) (silver) Liz Stephen (USA) (bronze) Heidi Weng (NOR)
      - Tour de Ski final standings: (1) Justyna Kowalczyk (POL) 2:25:21.6 (2) Johaug +27.9 (3) Kristin Størmer Steira (NOR) +2:39.5
        - Kowalczyk wins the Tour de Ski for the fourth successive time.

==== Curling ====
- Men's World Curling Tour:
  - Mercure Perth Masters final in Perth, Scotland: Thomas Ulsrud (NOR) 7–2 Mike McEwen (CAN)

==== Nordic combined ====
- World Cup:
  - HS 106 / 10 km in Schonach, Germany: (gold) Jason Lamy-Chappuis (FRA) (silver) Akito Watabe (JPN) (bronze) Magnus Moan (NOR)
    - Standings (after 6 of 17 races): (1) Lamy-Chappuis 455 points (2) Moan 383 (3) Eric Frenzel (GER) and Watabe 229

==== Ski jumping ====
- Four Hills Tournament:
  - Stage 4, HS 140 in Bischofshofen, Austria: (gold) Gregor Schlierenzauer (AUT) (silver) Anders Jacobsen (NOR) (bronze) Stefan Kraft (AUT)
    - Tournament final standings: (1) Schlierenzauer 1100.2 points (2) Jacobsen 1087.2 (3) Tom Hilde (NOR) 1029.2
      - Schlierenzauer wins the Four Hills Tournament for the second successive time.

=== 5 January 2013 (Saturday) ===
==== American football ====
- NFL playoffs:
  - AFC Wild Card playoffs in Houston, Texas: Houston Texans 19, Cincinnati Bengals 13.
  - NFC Wild Card playoffs in Green Bay, Wisconsin: Green Bay Packers 24, Minnesota Vikings 10.
- NCAA bowl games:
  - BBVA Compass Bowl in Birmingham, Alabama: Ole Miss 38, Pittsburgh 17.

==== Cross-country skiing ====
- Tour de Ski:
  - Stage 6 in Fiemme Valley, Italy:
    - Men's 15 km Classical Mass Start: (gold) Alexey Poltoranin (KAZ) (silver) Len Väljas (CAN) (bronze) Alex Harvey (CAN)
      - Tour de Ski standings (after 6 of 7 races): (1) Dario Cologna (SUI) 2:58:25.2 (2) Alexander Legkov (RUS) +6.5 (3) Petter Northug (NOR) +11.7
    - Women's 10 km Classical Mass Start: (gold) Justyna Kowalczyk (POL) (silver) Kristin Størmer Steira (NOR) (bronze) Krista Lähteenmäki (FIN)
      - Tour de Ski standings (after 6 of 7 races): (1) Kowalczyk 1:49:29.1 (2) Therese Johaug (NOR) +2:08.0 (3) Steira +2:17.9

==== Nordic combined ====
- World Cup:
  - HS 106 / Team in Schonach, Germany: (gold) Håvard Klemetsen/Magnus Moan/Mikko Kokslien/Jørgen Graabak (NOR) (silver) Johannes Rydzek/Tino Edelmann/Björn Kircheisen/Eric Frenzel (GER) (bronze) Bryan Fletcher/Taylor Fletcher/Todd Lodwick/Bill Demong (USA)

=== 4 January 2013 (Friday) ===
==== Alpine skiing ====
- Women's World Cup:
  - Slalom in Zagreb, Croatia: (gold) Mikaela Shiffrin (USA) (silver) Frida Hansdotter (SWE) (bronze) Erin Mielzynski (CAN)
    - Overall standings (after 18 of 37 races): (1) Tina Maze (SLO) 1139 points (2) Maria Höfl-Riesch (GER) 687 (3) Kathrin Zettel (AUT) 597
    - Slalom standings (after 6 of 11 races): (1) Shiffrin 336 points (2) Maze 310 (3) Veronika Zuzulová (SVK) 305

==== American football ====
- NCAA bowl games (BCS standings in brackets):
  - Cotton Bowl Classic in Arlington, Texas: [9] Texas A&M 41, [11] Oklahoma 13.

==== Cross-country skiing ====
- Tour de Ski:
  - Stage 5 in Toblach, Italy:
    - Men's 5 km Classical Individual Start: (gold) Alexey Poltoranin (KAZ) (silver) Petter Northug (NOR) (bronze) Dario Cologna (SUI)
      - Tour de Ski standings (after 5 of 7 races): (1) Northug 2:19:20.9 (2) Cologna +16.1 (3) Alexander Legkov (RUS) +23.4
    - Women's 3 km Classical Individual Start: (gold) Justyna Kowalczyk (POL) (silver) Krista Lähteenmäki (FIN) (bronze) Astrid Uhrenholdt Jacobsen (NOR)
      - Tour de Ski standings (after 5 of 7 races): (1) Kowalczyk 1:22:01.2 (2) Charlotte Kalla (SWE) +1:03.6 (3) Therese Johaug (NOR) +1:05.9

==== Ski jumping ====
- Four Hills Tournament:
  - Stage 3, HS 130 in Innsbruck, Austria: (gold) Gregor Schlierenzauer (AUT) (silver) Kamil Stoch (POL) (bronze) Anders Bardal (NOR)
    - Tournament standings (after 3 of 4 events): (1) Schlierenzauer 827.5 points (2) Anders Jacobsen (NOR) 816.8 (3) Tom Hilde (NOR) 778.3

=== 3 January 2013 (Thursday) ===
==== American football ====
- NCAA bowl games (BCS standings in brackets):
  - Bowl Championship Series:
    - Fiesta Bowl in Glendale, Arizona: [4] Oregon 35, [5] Kansas State 17.

==== Cricket ====
- Pakistan in India:
  - 2nd ODI in Kolkata: Pakistan 250 (48.3 overs); India 165 (48 overs). **Pakistan win by 85 runs; lead 3-match series 2–0.**

==== Cross-country skiing ====
- Tour de Ski:
  - Stage 4 in Cortina d'Ampezzo–Toblach, Italy:
    - Men's 35 km Freestyle Pursuit: (gold) Petter Northug (NOR) (silver) Alexander Legkov (RUS) (bronze) Dario Cologna (SUI)
      - Tour de Ski standings (after 4 of 7 races): (1) Northug 2:06:45.0 (2) Legkov +5.7 (3) Cologna +10.9
    - Women's 15 km Freestyle Pursuit: (gold) Justyna Kowalczyk (POL) (silver) Charlotte Kalla (SWE) (bronze) Therese Johaug (NOR)
      - Tour de Ski standings (after 4 of 7 races): (1) Kowalczyk 1:12:08.1 (2) Kalla +23.3 (3) Johaug +28.7

==== Ekiden ====
- Hakone Ekiden, 2nd Half in Japan:
  - 6th Section, 20.8 km from Lake Ashi to Odawara: (gold) Kenta Chiba, Komazawa University (silver) Daiki Hirose, Meiji University (bronze) Kazuyoshi Chiba, Teikyo University
    - General classification: (1) Nippon Sport Science University 6h 39' 48" (2) ▲1 Toyo University + 2' 22" (3) ▲1 Meiji University + 3' 08"
  - 7th Section, 21.3 km from Odawara to Hiratsuka: (gold) Kazuma Ganaha, Kanagawa University (silver) Shoji Tanaka, Nippon Sport Science University (bronze) Yuki Arimura, Meiji University
    - General classification: (1) Nippon Sport Science University 7h 44' 41" (2) Toyo University + 2' 51" (3) Meiji University + 3' 16"
  - 8th Section, 21.5 km from Hiratsuka to Totsuka: (gold) Soshi Takahashi, Aoyama Gakuin University (silver) Yuya Takayanagi, Nippon Sport Science University (bronze) Daiki Igari, Teikyo University
    - General classification: (1) Nippon Sport Science University 8h 51' 44" (2) Toyo University + 3' 12" (3) Meiji University + 3' 52"
  - 9th Section, 23.2 km from Totsuka to Tsurumi: (gold) Wataru Ueno, Komazawa University (silver) Keigo Yano, Nippon Sport Science University (bronze) Yuma Hattori, Toyo University
    - General classification: (1) Nippon Sport Science University 10h 02' 10" (2) Toyo University + 3' 48" (3) ▲3 Komazawa University + 6' 24"
  - 10th Section, 23.1 km from Tsurumi to Ōtemachi: (gold) Kensuke Gotoda, Komazawa University (silver) Yuichi Taninaga, Nippon Sport Science University (bronze) Taketo Kumazaki, Teikyo University
    - Final general classification: (1) Nippon Sport Science University 11h 13' 26" (2) Toyo University + 4' 54" (3) Komazawa University + 5' 57"
      - Nippon Sport Science University wins the Hakone Ekiden for the first time since 1983 and tenth time overall.

=== 2 January 2013 (Wednesday) ===
==== American football ====
- NCAA bowl games (BCS standings in brackets):
  - Bowl Championship Series:
    - Sugar Bowl in New Orleans, Louisiana: [21] Louisville 33, [3] Florida 23.

==== Ekiden ====
- Hakone Ekiden, 1st Half in Japan:
  - 1st Section, 21.4 km from Ōtemachi to Tsurumi: (gold) Masaya Taguchi, Toyo University (silver) Kei Fumimoto, Meiji University (bronze) Kazuto Nishiike, Hosei University
  - 2nd Section, 23.2 km from Tsurumi to Totsuka: (gold) Gandu Benjamin, Nihon University (silver) Omwamba Enock, Yamanashi Gakuin University (bronze) Keita Shitara, Toyo University
    - General classification: (1) ▲12 Nihon University 2h 14' 00" (2) ▼1 Toyo University + 1" (3) ▲4 Nippon Sport Science University + 54"
  - 3rd Section, 21.5 km from Totsuka to Hiratsuka: (gold) Yuta Shitara, Toyo University (silver) Suguru Osako, Waseda University (bronze) Shogo Nakamura, Komazawa University
    - General classification: (1) ▲1 Toyo University 3h 18' 37" (2) ▲4 Komazawa University + 2' 41" (3) ▲9 Waseda University + 2' 45"
  - 4th Section, 18.5 km from Hiratsuka to Odawara: (gold) Hideyuki Tanaka, Juntendo University (silver) Shohei Hayakawa, Teikyo University (bronze) Kazutaka Kuroyama, Hosei University
    - General classification: (1) Toyo University 4h 17' 51" (2) ▲2 Nippon Sport Science University + 1' 49" (3) Waseda University + 2' 07"
  - 5th Section, 23.4 km from Odawara to Lake Ashi: (gold) Shota Hattori, Nippon Sport Science University (silver) Shogo Sekiguchi, Hosei University (bronze) Shuhei Yamamoto, Waseda University
    - General classification: (1) ▲1 Nippon Sport Science University 5h 40' 15" (2) ▲1 Waseda University + 2' 36" (3) ▼2 Toyo University + 2' 39"

=== 1 January 2013 (Tuesday) ===
==== Alpine skiing ====
- Men's World Cup:
  - Parallel in Munich, Germany: (gold) Felix Neureuther (GER) (silver) Marcel Hirscher (AUT) (bronze) Alexis Pinturault (FRA)
    - Overall standings (after 15 of 36 races): (1) Aksel Lund Svindal (NOR) 689 points (2) Hirscher 640 (3) Ted Ligety (USA) 552
- Women's World Cup:
  - Parallel in Munich, Germany: (gold) Veronika Zuzulová (SVK) (silver) Tina Maze (SLO) (bronze) Michaela Kirchgasser (AUT)
    - Overall standings (after 17 of 37 races): (1) Maze 1139 points (2) Maria Höfl-Riesch (GER) 647 (3) Kathrin Zettel (AUT) 597

==== American football ====
- NCAA bowl games (BCS standings in brackets):
  - Bowl Championship Series:
    - Rose Bowl in Pasadena, California: [6] Stanford 20, Wisconsin 14.
    - Orange Bowl in Miami Gardens, Florida: [12] Florida State 31, [15] Northern Illinois 10.
  - Other games:
    - Gator Bowl in Jacksonville, Florida: [20] Northwestern 34, Mississippi State 20.
    - Heart of Dallas Bowl in Dallas, Texas: Oklahoma State 58, Purdue 14.
    - Capital One Bowl in Orlando, Florida: [7] Georgia 45, [16] Nebraska 31.
    - Outback Bowl in Tampa, Florida: [10] South Carolina 33, [18] Michigan 28.

==== Cross-country skiing ====
- Tour de Ski:
  - Stage 3 in Val Müstair, Italy:
    - Men's Sprint Freestyle: (gold) Finn Hågen Krogh (NOR) (silver) Federico Pellegrino (ITA) (bronze) Len Väljas (CAN)
      - Tour de Ski standings (after 3 of 7 races): (1) Maxim Vylegzhanin (RUS) 50:27.3 (2) Dario Cologna (SUI) +2.1 (3) Petter Northug (NOR) +9.0
    - Women's Sprint Freestyle: (gold) Kikkan Randall (USA) (silver) Ingvild Flugstad Østberg (NOR) (bronze) Heidi Weng (NOR)
      - Tour de Ski standings (after 3 of 7 races): (1) Justyna Kowalczyk (POL) 35:08.0 (2) Therese Johaug (NOR) +50.3 (3) Kristin Størmer Steira (NOR) +1:00.9

==== Ski jumping ====
- Four Hills Tournament:
  - Stage 2, HS 137 in Garmisch-Partenkirchen, Germany: (gold) Anders Jacobsen (NOR) (silver) Gregor Schlierenzauer (AUT) (bronze) Anders Bardal (NOR)
    - Tournament standings (after 2 of 4 events): (1) Jacobsen 586.3 points (2) Schlierenzauer 573.8 (3) Tom Hilde (NOR) 547.7
