= November 2012 in sports =

<<	November 2012					>>
Su	Mo	Tu	We	Th	Fr	Sa
				1	2	3
4	5	6	7	8	9	10
11	12	13	14	15	16	17
18	19	20	21	22	23	24
25	26	27	28	29	30
Sports

This list shows notable sports-related deaths, events, and notable outcomes that occurred in November of 2012.

== Days of the month ==
=== 30 November 2012 (Friday) ===
==== Alpine skiing ====
- Men's World Cup:
  - Downhill in Beaver Creek, United States: (gold) Christof Innerhofer (ITA) (silver) Aksel Lund Svindal (NOR) (bronze) Kjetil Jansrud (NOR)
    - Overall standings (after 5 of 36 races): (1) Svindal 280 points (2) Ted Ligety (USA) 170 (3) Marcel Hirscher (AUT) 140
    - Downhill standings (after 2 of 9 races): (1) Svindal 180 points (2) Innerhofer 104 (3) Klaus Kröll (AUT) 89
- Women's World Cup:
  - Downhill in Lake Louise, Canada: (gold) Lindsey Vonn (USA) (silver) Stacey Cook (USA) (bronze) Maria Höfl-Riesch (GER) and Tina Weirather (LIE)
    - Overall standings (after 5 of 37 races): (1) Tina Maze (SLO) 321 points (2) Kathrin Zettel (AUT) 260 (3) Höfl-Riesch 234

==== American football ====
- NCAA Division I FBS (BCS standings in brackets):
  - MAC Championship Game in Detroit, Michigan: [21] Northern Illinois 44, [17] Kent State 37 (2OT).
  - Pac-12 Championship Game in Stanford, California: [8] Stanford 27, [16] UCLA 24.

=== 27 November 2012 (Tuesday) ===
The Philippine Collegiate Champions League final is the UST Tigers against the ADMU Blue Eagles.

=== 25 November 2012 (Sunday) ===
==== Alpine skiing ====
- Men's World Cup:
  - Super Giant Slalom in Lake Louise, Canada: (gold) Aksel Lund Svindal (NOR) (silver) Adrien Théaux (FRA) (bronze) Joachim Puchner (AUT)
    - Overall standings (after 4 of 36 races): (1) Svindal 200 points (2) Ted Ligety (USA) 170 (3) Marcel Hirscher (AUT) 140
- Women's World Cup:
  - Slalom in Aspen, United States: (gold) Kathrin Zettel (AUT) (silver) Marlies Schild (AUT) (bronze) Tina Maze (SLO)
    - Overall standings (after 4 of 37 races): (1) Maze 310 points (2) Zettel 260 (3) Maria Höfl-Riesch (GER) 174
    - Slalom standings (after 2 of 11 races): (1) Höfl-Riesch 150 points (2) Tanja Poutiainen (FIN) 112 (3) Maze 110

==== Auto racing ====
- Formula One:
  - Brazilian Grand Prix in São Paulo, Brazil: (1) Jenson Button (GBR) (McLaren–Mercedes) (2) Fernando Alonso (ESP) (Ferrari) (3) Felipe Massa (BRA) (Ferrari)
    - Final drivers' championship standings: (1) Sebastian Vettel (GER) (Red Bull–Renault) 281 points (2) Alonso 278 (3) Kimi Räikkönen (FIN) (Lotus-Renault) 207
      - Vettel wins his third consecutive World Championship.
    - Final constructors' championship standings: (1) Red Bull-Renault 460 points (2) Ferrari 400 (3) McLaren-Mercedes 378

==== Canadian football ====
- Grey Cup in Toronto, Ontario: Toronto Argonauts 35, Calgary Stampeders 22.
  - Argonauts win the Grey Cup for the first time since 2004 and sixteenth time overall. Argonauts running back Chad Kackert is named Most Valuable Player.

==== Nordic combined ====
- World Cup:
  - HS 138 / Penalty Race in Lillehammer, Norway: (gold) Magnus Moan (NOR) (silver) Håvard Klemetsen (NOR) (bronze) Eric Frenzel (GER)
    - Standings (after 2 of 17 races): (1) Moan 200 points (2) Jason Lamy-Chappuis (FRA) and Klemetsen 130

==== Rugby union ====
- End of year tests, Week 4:
  - In Le Havre, France: French Barbarians 65–41 Japan

=== 24 November 2012 (Saturday) ===
==== Alpine skiing ====
- Men's World Cup:
  - Downhill in Lake Louise, Canada: (gold) Aksel Lund Svindal (NOR) (silver) Max Franz (AUT) (bronze) Marco Sullivan (USA) and Klaus Kröll (AUT)
    - Overall standings (after 3 of 36 races): (1) Marcel Hirscher (AUT) 140 points (2) Manfred Mölgg (ITA) 130 (3) Ted Ligety (USA) 120
- Women's World Cup:
  - Giant Slalom in Aspen, United States: (gold) Tina Maze (SLO) (silver) Kathrin Zettel (AUT) (bronze) Viktoria Rebensburg (GER)
    - Overall standings (after 3 of 37 races): (1) Maze 250 points (2) Zettel 160 (3) Maria Höfl-Riesch (GER) 124
    - Giant Slalom standings (after 2 of 9 races): (1) Maze 200 points (2) Zettel 160 (3) Irene Curtoni (ITA) 77

==== American football ====
- NCAA Division I FBS (BCS standings in brackets):
  - In Los Angeles, California: [1] Notre Dame 22, USC 13.
    - Notre Dame secures spot in the BCS National Championship Game after claiming the Jeweled Shillelagh to complete perfect 12–0 regular season.
  - In Logan, Utah: Utah State 45, Idaho 9.
    - Utah State, who will move to the MWC in 2013, wins their first WAC championship.
  - In Columbus, Ohio: Ohio State 26, [19] Michigan 21.
    - Ohio State, who is ineligible for any post-season bowl games due to NCAA sanctions, wins The Game to finish their season with perfect 12–0 record.

==== Nordic combined ====
- World Cup:
  - HS 100 / 10 km in Lillehammer, Norway: (gold) Magnus Moan (NOR) (silver) Jason Lamy-Chappuis (FRA) (bronze) Bernhard Gruber (AUT)

==== Rugby union ====
- End of year tests, Week 4:
  - In Tbilisi, Georgia: Georgia 19–24 Fiji
  - In Dublin, Ireland: Ireland 46–24 Argentina
  - In Florence, Italy: Italy 19–22 Australia
  - In Bucharest, Romania: Romania 3–34 United States
  - In London, England: England 15–16 South Africa
  - In Aberdeen, Scotland: Scotland 15–21 Tonga
  - In Saint-Denis, France: France 22–14 Samoa
  - In Cardiff, Wales: Wales 10–33 New Zealand

==== Sumo ====
- Kyūshū basho (November grand tournament) in Fukuoka, Japan:
  - Hakuhō Shō clinches the tournament for the first time since last March, and earns his 23rd makuuchi (top division) championship to surpass former yokozuna Takanohana Kōji for 5th on the all-time list.

=== 23 November 2012 (Friday) ===
==== Canadian football ====
- Vanier Cup in Toronto, Ontario: Laval Rouge et Or 37, McMaster Marauders 14.

==== Rugby union ====
- End of year tests, Week 4:
  - In Oxford, England: Canada 19–32 Māori All Blacks

=== 22 November 2012 (Thursday) ===
==== American football ====
- NFL, Week 12:
  - Thanksgiving Day games:
    - In Detroit, Michigan: Houston Texans 34, Detroit Lions 31 (OT).
    - In Arlington, Texas: Washington Redskins 38, Dallas Cowboys 31.
    - Sunday Night Football in East Rutherford, New Jersey: New England Patriots 49, New York Jets 19.

=== 21 November 2012 (Wednesday) ===
==== Rugby union ====
- End of year tests, Week 4:
  - In Biarritz, France: Basque Selection (Basque Country (autonomous community)) 19–3 Japan

=== 20 November 2012 (Tuesday) ===
==== Basketball ====
- NCAA Division III Basketball: Grinnell Pioneers guard Jack Taylor scores an NCAA-record 138 points in a game in a 179–104 victory over Faith Baptist Bible.

=== 19 November 2012 (Monday) ===
==== Baseball ====
- World Baseball Classic Qualifier 4 Final in Panama City, Panama: Brazil 1, Panama 0. **Brazil qualifies for the main tournament in March 2013.**

=== 18 November 2012 (Sunday) ===
==== Auto racing ====
- Formula One:
  - United States Grand Prix in Austin, Texas: (1) Lewis Hamilton (GBR) (McLaren–Mercedes) (2) Sebastian Vettel (GER) (Red Bull–Renault) (3) Fernando Alonso (ESP) (Ferrari)
    - Drivers' championship standings (after 19 of 20 races): (1) Vettel 273 points (2) Alonso 260 (3) Kimi Räikkönen (FIN) (Lotus-Renault) 206
    - Constructors' championship standings: (1) Red Bull-Renault 440 points (2) Ferrari 367 (3) McLaren-Mercedes 353
      - Red Bull win their third consecutive title.
- Sprint Cup Series – Chase for the Sprint Cup:
  - Ford EcoBoost 400 in Homestead, Florida: (1) (California) Jeff Gordon (Chevrolet; Hendrick Motorsports) (2) (Kansas) Clint Bowyer (Toyota; Michael Waltrip Racing) (3) (Indiana) Ryan Newman (Chevrolet; Stewart–Haas Racing)
    - Final drivers' championship standings: (1) (Michigan) Brad Keselowski (Dodge; Penske Racing) 2400 points (2) Bowyer 2361 (3) (California) Jimmie Johnson (Chevrolet; Hendrick Motorsports) 2360
      - Keselowski wins his first Sprint Cup title.

==== Baseball ====
- World Baseball Classic qualification:
  - Qualifier 3 in Panama City, Panama: Panama 9, Colombia 7. Colombia is eliminated.
  - Qualifier 4 Final in New Taipei City, Taiwan: Chinese Taipei 9, New Zealand 0. **Chinese Taipei qualifies for the main tournament in March 2013.**

==== Canadian football ====
- CFL playoffs:
  - East Division Final in Montreal, Quebec: Toronto Argonauts 27, Montreal Alouettes 20.
  - West Division Final in Vancouver, British Columbia: Calgary Stampeders 34, BC Lions 29.

==== Futsal ====
- FIFA World Cup in Thailand:
  - Third place match in Bangkok: **Italy** (bronze) 3–0 Colombia
  - Final in Bangkok: Spain (silver) 2–3 (a.e.t.) (gold) **Brazil**
    - Brazil defended their title, and winning it for the fifth time.

==== Tennis ====
- Davis Cup World Group, Finals, day 3 in Prague, Czech Republic: **Czech Republic** 3–2 Spain
  - **David Ferrer** (ESP) def. Tomáš Berdych (CZE) 6–2, 6–3, 7–5
  - **Radek Štěpánek** (CZE) def. Nicolás Almagro (ESP) 6–4, 7–6^{(7–0)}, 3–6, 6–3
    - Czech Republic defeat the reigning Davis Cup champion Spain to win his first title since 1980 (as Czechoslovakia), and become the first country to win Davis Cup, Fed Cup and Hopman Cup in one year.

=== 17 November 2012 (Saturday) ===
==== American football ====
- NCAA Division I FBS (BCS standings in brackets):
  - In Waco, Texas: Baylor 52, [1] Kansas State 24.
  - In Eugene, Oregon: [13] Stanford 17, [2] Oregon 14 (OT).
  - In South Bend, Indiana: [3] Notre Dame 38, Wake Forest 0.
    - With these outcomes, Notre Dame becomes this season's last undefeated bowl-eligible team, with a record of 11–0, going into their season finale against USC.

==== Baseball ====
- World Baseball Classic qualification:
  - Qualifier 3 in Panama City, Panama:
    - Brazil 7, Colombia 1.
    - Panama 6, Nicaragua 2. Nicaragua is eliminated.
  - Qualifier 4 in New Taipei City, Taiwan: New Zealand 10, Philippines 6. Philippines is eliminated.

==== Mixed martial arts ====
- UFC 154 in Montreal, Quebec, Canada:
  - Featherweight bout: **Pablo Garza** (USA) def. Mark Hominick (CAN) via unanimous decision (29–27, 30–26, 29–28)
  - Lightweight bout: **Rafael dos Anjos** (BRA) def. Mark Bocek (CAN) via unanimous decision (30–27, 30–27, 30–27)
  - Middleweight bout: **Francis Carmont** (FRA) def. Tom Lawlor (USA) via split decision (29–28, 28–29, 29–28)
  - Welterweight bout: **Johny Hendricks** (USA) def. Martin Kampmann (DEN) via KO (punch)
  - Welterweight Championship unification bout: **Georges St-Pierre** (CAN) (c) def. Carlos Condit (USA) (ic) via unanimous decision (49–46, 50–45, 50–45)

==== Rugby union ====
- End of year tests, Week 3:
  - In Tbilisi, Georgia: Georgia 22–25 Japan
  - In Doncaster, England: RFU Championship XV 21–52 Māori All Blacks
  - In Rome, Italy: Italy 10–42 New Zealand
  - In London, England: England 14–20 Australia
  - In Edinburgh, Scotland: Scotland 10–21 South Africa
  - In Limerick, Ireland: Ireland XV 53–0 Fiji
  - In Villeneuve-d'Ascq, France: France 39–22 Argentina
  - In Santiago, Chile: Chile 22–28 Portugal
- International Rugby Series, Week 2 in Colwyn Bay, Wales:
  - United States 13–22 Tonga
  - Canada 35–3 Russia
- Namibian Tri-Nations in Windhoek, Namibia: Namibia 37–38 Spain

==== Tennis ====
- Davis Cup World Group, Finals, day 2 in Prague, Czech Republic: Czech Republic 2–1 Spain
  - **Tomáš Berdych/Radek Štěpánek** (CZE) def. Marcel Granollers/Marc López (ESP) 3–6, 7–5, 7–5, 6–3

=== 16 November 2012 (Friday) ===
==== Baseball ====
- World Baseball Classic qualification:
  - Qualifier 3 in Panama City, Panama: Colombia 8, Nicaragua 1.
  - Qualifier 4 in New Taipei City, Taiwan:
    - New Zealand 12, Thailand 2 (F/8). Thailand is eliminated.
    - Chinese Taipei 16, Philippines 0 (F/7).

==== Rugby union ====
- End of year tests, Week 3:
  - In Cardiff, Wales: Wales 19–26 Samoa

==== Tennis ====
- Davis Cup World Group, Finals, day 1 in Prague, Czech Republic: Czech Republic 1–1 Spain
  - **David Ferrer** (ESP) def. Radek Štěpánek (CZE) 6–3, 6–4, 6–4
  - **Tomáš Berdych** (CZE) def. Nicolás Almagro (ESP) 6–3, 3–6, 6–3, 6–7^{(5–7)}, 6–3

=== 15 November 2012 (Thursday) ===
==== Baseball ====
- World Baseball Classic qualification:
  - Qualifier 3 in Panama City, Panama: Brazil 3, Panama 2.
  - Qualifier 4 in New Taipei City, Taiwan:
    - Philippines 8, Thailand 2.
    - Chinese Taipei 10, New Zealand 0 (F/7).

=== 14 November 2012 (Wednesday) ===
==== Rugby union ====
- Namibian Tri-Nations in Windhoek, Namibia: Zimbabwe 14–47 Spain

=== 13 November 2012 (Tuesday) ===
==== Rugby union ====
- End of year tests, Week 3:
  - In Leicester, England: Leicester Tigers 32–24 Māori All Blacks
  - In Gloucester, England: Gloucester 31–29 Fiji
  - In Newcastle upon Tyne, England: Newcastle Falcons 24–13 Tonga

=== 11 November 2012 (Sunday) ===
==== Alpine skiing ====
- Men's World Cup:
  - Slalom in Levi, Finland: (gold) André Myhrer (SWE) (silver) Marcel Hirscher (AUT) (bronze) Jens Byggmark (SWE)
    - Overall standings (after 2 of 36 races): (1) Hirscher 140 points (2) Manfred Mölgg (ITA) 130 (3) Ted Ligety (USA) 120

==== American football ====
- NFL, Week 10:
  - In New Orleans, Louisiana: New Orleans Saints 31, Atlanta Falcons 27.
    - The Falcons' first loss comes on the 40th Anniversary of the unbeaten season of the 1972 Miami Dolphins, who remain the only team to accomplish such a season from opening game to Super Bowl VII.
  - In San Francisco, California: St. Louis Rams 24, San Francisco 49ers 24 (OT).
    - The Rams and the 49ers play to NFL's first tie game since 16 November 2008.

==== Auto racing ====
- Sprint Cup Series – Chase for the Sprint Cup:
  - AdvoCare 500 in Avondale, Arizona: (1) (California) Kevin Harvick (Chevrolet; Richard Childress Racing) (2) (Florida) Denny Hamlin (Toyota; Joe Gibbs Racing) (3) (Nevada) Kyle Busch (Toyota; Joe Gibbs Racing)
    - Drivers' championship standings (after 35 of 36 races): (1) (Michigan) Brad Keselowski (Dodge; Penske Racing) 2371 points (2) (California) Jimmie Johnson (Chevrolet; Hendrick Motorsports) 2351 (3) (Washington (state)) Kasey Kahne (Chevrolet; Hendrick Motorsports) 2321

==== Baseball ====
- Asia Series Final in Busan, South Korea: (Japan) Yomiuri Giants 6, (Taiwan) Lamigo Monkeys 3.
  - The Giants win their first Asia Series championship. Giants infielder Hayato Sakamoto is named series MVP.

==== Canadian football ====
- CFL playoffs:
  - East Division Semifinal in Toronto, Ontario: Toronto Argonauts 42, Edmonton Eskimos 26.
  - West Division Semifinal in Calgary, Alberta: Calgary Stampeders 36, Saskatchewan Roughriders 30.

==== Rugby league ====
- Autumn International Series Final in Salford, England: England 48–4 France

==== Rugby union ====
- End of year tests, Week 2:
  - In Edinburgh, Scotland: Scotland 22–51 New Zealand
  - In Montevideo, Uruguay: Uruguay 25–32 Portugal

=== 10 November 2012 (Saturday) ===
==== Alpine skiing ====
- Women's World Cup:
  - Slalom in Levi, Finland: (gold) Maria Höfl-Riesch (GER) (silver) Tanja Poutiainen (FIN) (bronze) Mikaela Shiffrin (USA)
    - Overall standings (after 2 of 37 races): (1) Tina Maze (SLO) 150 points (2) Höfl-Riesch 124 (3) Poutiainen 91

==== Baseball ====
- Asia Series in Busan, South Korea (teams in **bold** advance to the Final):
  - Group A: (South Korea) Samsung Lions 9, China Stars 0.
  - Group B: (Japan) **Yomiuri Giants** 5, (South Korea) Lotte Giants 0.

==== Mixed martial arts ====
- UFC on Fuel TV: Franklin vs. Le in Cotai Strip, Macau:
  - Bantamweight bout: **Takeya Mizugaki** (JPN) def. Jeff Hougland (USA) via unanimous decision (30–25, 30–27, 30–27)
  - Lightweight bout: **Jon Tuck** (GUM) def. Zhang Tiequan (CHN) via unanimous decision (29–28, 30–27, 29–28)
  - Lightweight bout: **Takanori Gomi** (JPN) def. Mac Danzig (USA) via split decision (28–29, 29–28, 29–28)
  - Welterweight bout: **Dong Hyun Kim** (KOR) def. Paulo Thiago (BRA) via unanimous decision (30–26, 30–27, 30–27)
  - Light Heavyweight bout: **Thiago Silva** (BRA) def. Stanislav Nedkov (BUL) via submission (arm-triangle choke)
  - Middleweight bout: **Cung Le** (VIE) def. Rich Franklin (USA) via KO (punch)

==== Rugby union ====
- End of year tests, Week 2:
  - In Bucharest, Romania: Romania 23–34 Japan
  - In Brescia, Italy: Italy 28–23 Tonga
  - In London, England: England 54–12 Fiji
  - In Cardiff, Wales: Wales 12–26 Argentina
  - In Dublin, Ireland: Ireland 12–16 South Africa
  - In Saint-Denis, France: France 33–6 Australia
- Namibian Tri-Nations in Windhoek, Namibia: Namibia 37–33 Zimbabwe

=== 9 November 2012 (Friday) ===
==== Baseball ====
- Asia Series in Busan, South Korea (teams in **bold** advance to the Final):
  - Group A: (Taiwan) **Lamigo Monkeys** 3, (South Korea) Samsung Lions 0.
  - Group B: (Japan) Yomiuri Giants 7, (Australia) Perth Heat 1.

==== Rugby union ====
- International Rugby Series, Week 1 in Colwyn Bay, Wales:
  - United States 40–26 Russia
  - Canada 12–42 Samoa

=== 8 November 2012 (Thursday) ===
==== Baseball ====
- Asia Series in Busan, South Korea:
  - Group A: (Taiwan) Lamigo Monkeys 14, China Stars 1 (F/7).
  - Group B: (South Korea) Lotte Giants 6, (Australia) Perth Heat 1.

=== 7 November 2012 (Wednesday) ===
Celtic defeat FC Barcelona 2–1 in the UEFA Champions League group stage in the week of the Scottish club's 125th anniversary.

=== 4 November 2012 (Sunday) ===
==== Auto racing ====
- Formula One:
  - Abu Dhabi Grand Prix in Abu Dhabi, United Arab Emirates: (1) Kimi Räikkönen (FIN) (Lotus–Renault) (2) Fernando Alonso (ESP) (Ferrari) (3) Sebastian Vettel (GER) (Red Bull-Renault)
    - Drivers' championship standings (after 18 of 20 races): (1) Vettel 255 points (2) Alonso 245 (3) Räikkönen 198
    - Constructors' championship standings: (1) Red Bull-Renault 422 points (2) Ferrari 340 (3) McLaren–Mercedes 318
- Sprint Cup Series – Chase for the Sprint Cup:
  - AAA Texas 500 in Fort Worth, Texas: (1) (California) Jimmie Johnson (Chevrolet; Hendrick Motorsports) (2) (Michigan) Brad Keselowski (Dodge; Penske Racing) (3) (Nevada) Kyle Busch (Toyota; Joe Gibbs Racing)
    - Drivers' championship standings (after 34 of 36 races): (1) Johnson 2339 points (2) Keselowski 2332 (3) (Kansas) Clint Bowyer (Toyota; Michael Waltrip Racing) 2303

==== Rugby union ====
- End of year tests, Week 1:
  - In Oxford, England: Oxford University 15–29 Russia

==== Tennis ====
- Fed Cup World Group, Finals, day 2 in Prague, Czech Republic: Serbia 1–3 **Czech Republic**
  - **Ana Ivanovic** (SER) def. Petra Kvitová (CZE) 6–3, 7–5
  - **Lucie Šafářová** (CZE) def. Jelena Janković (SER) 6–1, 6–1
    - Czech Republic win the title for the second successive year.

=== 3 November 2012 (Saturday) ===
==== Baseball ====
- Japan Series:
  - Game 6 in Bunkyo, Tokyo: Yomiuri Giants 4, Hokkaido Nippon-Ham Fighters 3. **Giants win series 4–2.**
    - The Giants win the Japan Series for the first time since 2009, and the 22nd time overall. Giants pitcher Tetsuya Utsumi is named series MVP.

==== Rugby league ====
- Autumn International Series:
  - In Hull, England: England 44–6 France

==== Tennis ====
- Fed Cup World Group, Finals, day 1 in Prague, Czech Republic: Serbia 0–2 Czech Republic
  - **Lucie Šafářová** (CZE) def. Ana Ivanovic (SER) 6–4, 6–3
  - **Petra Kvitová** (CZE) def. Jelena Janković (SER) 6–4, 6–1

=== 1 November 2012 (Thursday) ===
==== Baseball ====
- Japan Series:
  - Game 5 in Sapporo, Hokkaido: Yomiuri Giants 10, Hokkaido Nippon-Ham Fighters 2. Giants lead series 3–2.
