= October 2012 in sports =

<<	October 2012					>>
Su	Mo	Tu	We	Th	Fr	Sa
	1	2	3	4	5	6
7	8	9	10	11	12	13
14	15	16	17	18	19	20
21	22	23	24	25	26	27
28	29	30	31
Sports

This list shows notable sports-related deaths, events, and notable outcomes that occurred in October of 2012.

== Days of the month ==
=== 31 October 2012 (Wednesday) ===
==== Baseball ====
- Japan Series:
  - Game 4 in Sapporo, Hokkaido: Hokkaido Nippon-Ham Fighters 1, Yomiuri Giants 0 (F/12). Series tied 2–2.

==== Football (soccer) ====
- Football League Championship: Former Manchester United and Blackburn Rovers player Henning Berg is appointed manager of Blackburn following Steve Kean's resignation a few weeks prior.

=== 30 October 2012 (Tuesday) ===
==== Baseball ====
- Japan Series:
  - Game 3 in Sapporo, Hokkaido: Hokkaido Nippon-Ham Fighters 7, Yomiuri Giants 3. Giants lead series 2–1.

==== Basketball ====
- NBA season opening day:
  - In Cleveland, Ohio: Cleveland Cavaliers 94, Washington Wizards 84.
  - In Miami, Florida: Miami Heat 120, Boston Celtics 107.
  - In Los Angeles, California: Dallas Mavericks 99, Los Angeles Lakers 91.

=== 28 October 2012 (Sunday) ===
==== Alpine skiing ====
- Men's World Cup:
  - Giant Slalom in Sölden, Austria: (gold) Ted Ligety (USA) (silver) Manfred Mölgg (ITA) (bronze) Marcel Hirscher (AUT)

==== American football ====
- NFL, Week 8:
  - International Series in London, England: New England Patriots 45, St. Louis Rams 7.

==== Auto racing ====
- Formula One:
  - Indian Grand Prix in Greater Noida, India: (1) Sebastian Vettel (GER) (Red Bull–Renault) (2) Mark Webber (AUS) (Red Bull-Renault) (3) Lewis Hamilton (GBR) (McLaren–Mercedes)
    - Drivers' championship standings (after 17 of 20 races): (1) Vettel 240 points (2) Fernando Alonso (ESP) (Ferrari) 227 (3) Kimi Räikkönen (FIN) (Lotus-Renault) 173
    - Constructors' championship standings: (1) Red Bull-Renault 407 points (2) Ferrari 316 (3) McLaren-Mercedes 306
- Sprint Cup Series – Chase for the Sprint Cup:
  - Tums Fast Relief 500 in Martinsville, Virginia: (1) (California) Jimmie Johnson (Chevrolet; Hendrick Motorsports) (2) (Nevada) Kyle Busch (Toyota; Joe Gibbs Racing) (3) (Washington (state)) Kasey Kahne (Chevrolet; Hendrick Motorsports)
    - Drivers' championship standings (after 33 of 36 races): (1) Johnson 2291 points (2) (Michigan) Brad Keselowski (Dodge; Penske Racing) 2289 (3) (Kansas) Clint Bowyer (Toyota; Michael Waltrip Racing) 2265

==== Baseball ====
- World Series:
  - Game 4 in Detroit, Michigan: San Francisco Giants 4, Detroit Tigers 3 (F/10). **Giants win series 4–0.**
    - The Giants win the World Series for the second time in three years, and the seventh time overall. Giants infielder Pablo Sandoval is named series MVP after hitting .500 with three home runs and four RBIs in four games.
- Japan Series:
  - Game 2 in Bunkyo, Tokyo: Yomiuri Giants 1, Hokkaido Nippon-Ham Fighters 0. Giants lead series 2–0.

=== 27 October 2012 (Saturday) ===
==== Alpine skiing ====
- Women's World Cup:
  - Giant Slalom in Sölden, Austria: (gold) Tina Maze (SLO) (silver) Kathrin Zettel (AUT) (bronze) Stefanie Köhle (AUT)

==== Baseball ====
- World Series:
  - Game 3 in Detroit, Michigan: San Francisco Giants 2, Detroit Tigers 0. Giants lead series 3–0.
- Japan Series:
  - Game 1 in Bunkyo, Tokyo: Yomiuri Giants 8, Hokkaido Nippon-Ham Fighters 1. Giants lead series 1–0.

==== Rugby league ====
- Autumn International Series:
  - In Wrexham, Wales: Wales 12–80 England

=== 26 October 2012 (Friday) ===
==== Basketball ====
- NCAA (Philippines):
  - Men's Finals Game 3 in Quezon City, Philippines: San Beda College 67, Colegio de San Juan de Letran 39. **San Beda win series 2–1.**
    - San Beda wins their record 17th NCAA championship, and their second three-consecutive championship streak in seven years.

=== 25 October 2012 (Thursday) ===
==== Baseball ====
- World Series:
  - Game 2 in San Francisco, California: San Francisco Giants 2, Detroit Tigers 0. Giants lead series 2–0.

=== 24 October 2012 (Wednesday) ===
==== Baseball ====
- World Series:
  - Game 1 in San Francisco, California: San Francisco Giants 8, Detroit Tigers 3. Giants lead series 1–0.
    - Giants infielder Pablo Sandoval becomes only the fourth player to hit three home runs in a World Series game, joining Babe Ruth (1926, Game 4 & 1928, Game 4), Reggie Jackson (1977, Game 6) and Albert Pujols (2011, Game 3).

=== 22 October 2012 (Monday) ===
==== Baseball ====
- Major League Baseball postseason:
  - National League Championship Series Game 7 in San Francisco, California: San Francisco Giants 9, St. Louis Cardinals 0. **Giants win series 4–3.**
    - The Giants win their first NLCS since 2010, and their 22nd NL pennant overall. Giants infielder Marco Scutaro is named series MVP after setting a new LCS record with six multi-hit games.
    - The Cardinals, the reigning World Series champion, are eliminated. Thus for the twelfth consecutive year, Major League Baseball will crown a new World Champion.
- Nippon Professional Baseball Climax Series, Final Stage:
  - Central League Game 6 in Bunkyo, Tokyo: Yomiuri Giants 4, Chunichi Dragons 2. **Giants win series 4–3.**
    - The Giants advance to the Japan Series for the first time since 2009. Giants infielder Yoshihito Ishii is named stage MVP.

=== 21 October 2012 (Sunday) ===
==== Auto racing ====
- Sprint Cup Series – Chase for the Sprint Cup:
  - Hollywood Casino 400 in Kansas City, Kansas: (1) (Wisconsin) Matt Kenseth (Ford; Roush Fenway Racing) (2) (New Jersey) Martin Truex Jr. (Toyota; Michael Waltrip Racing) (3) (Wisconsin) Paul Menard (Chevrolet; Richard Childress Racing)
    - Drivers' championship standings (after 32 of 36 races): (1) (Michigan) Brad Keselowski (Dodge; Penske Racing) 2250 points (2) (California) Jimmie Johnson (Chevrolet; Hendrick Motorsports) 2243 (3) (Virginia) Denny Hamlin (Toyota; Joe Gibbs Racing) 2230

==== Baseball ====
- Major League Baseball postseason:
  - National League Championship Series Game 6 in San Francisco, California: San Francisco Giants 6, St. Louis Cardinals 1. Series tied 3–3.
- Nippon Professional Baseball Climax Series, Final Stage:
  - Central League Game 5 in Bunkyo, Tokyo: Yomiuri Giants 3, Chunichi Dragons 2. Series tied 3–3.

==== Basketball ====
- WNBA Finals:
  - Game 4 in Indianapolis, Indiana: Indiana Fever 87, Minnesota Lynx 78. **Fever win series 3–1.**
    - Fever win the title for the first time in franchise history. Fever forward Tamika Catchings is named Finals MVP.

=== 20 October 2012 (Saturday) ===
==== Baseball ====
- Nippon Professional Baseball Climax Series, Final Stage:
  - Central League Game 4 in Bunkyo, Tokyo: Yomiuri Giants 3, Chunichi Dragons 1. Dragons lead series 3–2.

==== Basketball ====
- NCAA (Philippines):
  - Men's Finals Game 2 in Quezon City, Philippines: Colegio de San Juan de Letran 64, San Beda College 55. Series tied 1–1.

==== Rugby league ====
- Autumn International Series:
  - In Lens, France: France 20–6 Wales

==== Rugby union ====
- End of year tests:
  - Bledisloe Cup, Match 3 in Brisbane, Australia: Australia 18–18 New Zealand

=== 19 October 2012 (Friday) ===
==== Baseball ====
- Major League Baseball postseason:
  - National League Championship Series Game 5 in St. Louis, Missouri: San Francisco Giants 5, St. Louis Cardinals 0. Cardinals lead series 3–2.
- Nippon Professional Baseball Climax Series, Final Stage:
  - Central League Game 3 in Bunkyo, Tokyo: Chunichi Dragons 5, Yomiuri Giants 4 (F/10). Dragons lead series 3–1.
  - Pacific League Game 3 in Sapporo, Hokkaido: Hokkaido Nippon-Ham Fighters 4, Fukuoka SoftBank Hawks 2. **Fighters win series 4–0.**
    - The Fighters advance to the Japan Series for the first time since 2009. Fighters outfielder Yoshio Itoi is named stage MVP.

==== Basketball ====
- WNBA Finals:
  - Game 3 in Indianapolis, Indiana: Indiana Fever 76, Minnesota Lynx 51. Fever lead series 2–1.

=== 18 October 2012 (Thursday) ===
==== Baseball ====
- Major League Baseball postseason:
  - American League Championship Series Game 4 in Detroit, Michigan: Detroit Tigers 8, New York Yankees 1. **Tigers win series 4–0.**
    - The Tigers win their first ALCS since 2006, and their 11th AL pennant overall. Tigers outfielder Delmon Young is named series MVP after hitting .308 with two home runs and five RBIs in four games.
  - National League Championship Series Game 4 in St. Louis, Missouri: St. Louis Cardinals 8, San Francisco Giants 3. Cardinals lead series 3–1.
- Nippon Professional Baseball Climax Series, Final Stage:
  - Central League Game 2 in Bunkyo, Tokyo: Chunichi Dragons 5, Yomiuri Giants 2. Dragons lead series 2–1.
  - Pacific League Game 2 in Sapporo, Hokkaido: Hokkaido Nippon-Ham Fighters 3, Fukuoka SoftBank Hawks 0. Fighters lead series 3–0.

==== Basketball ====
- NCAA (Philippines):
  - Men's Finals Game 1 in Pasay, Philippines: San Beda College 62, Colegio de San Juan de Letran 60. San Beda lead series 1–0.

=== 17 October 2012 (Wednesday) ===
==== Baseball ====
- Major League Baseball postseason:
  - American League Championship Series Game 4 in Detroit, Michigan: New York Yankees vs. Detroit Tigers — postponed to 18 October due to rain.
  - National League Championship Series Game 3 in St. Louis, Missouri: St. Louis Cardinals 3, San Francisco Giants 1. Cardinals lead series 2–1.
- Nippon Professional Baseball Climax Series, Final Stage:
  - Central League Game 1 in Bunkyo, Tokyo: Chunichi Dragons 3, Yomiuri Giants 1. Series tied 1–1.
  - Pacific League Game 1 in Sapporo, Hokkaido: Hokkaido Nippon-Ham Fighters 3, Fukuoka SoftBank Hawks 2. Fighters lead series 2–0.

==== Basketball ====
- WNBA Finals:
  - Game 2 in Minneapolis, Minnesota: Minnesota Lynx 83, Indiana Fever 71. Series tied 1–1.

=== 16 October 2012 (Tuesday) ===
==== Baseball ====
- Major League Baseball postseason:
  - American League Championship Series Game 3 in Detroit, Michigan: Detroit Tigers 2, New York Yankees 1. Tigers lead series 3–0.

=== 15 October 2012 (Monday) ===
==== Baseball ====
- Major League Baseball postseason:
  - National League Championship Series Game 2 in San Francisco, California: San Francisco Giants 7, St. Louis Cardinals 1. Series tied 1–1.
- Nippon Professional Baseball Climax Series, First Stage:
  - Central League Game 3 in Nagoya, Aichi: Chunichi Dragons 4, Tokyo Yakult Swallows 1. **Dragons win series 2–1.**
  - Pacific League Game 3 in Tokorozawa, Saitama: Fukuoka SoftBank Hawks 3, Saitama Seibu Lions 2. **Hawks win series 2–1.**

=== 14 October 2012 (Sunday) ===
==== Auto racing ====
- Formula One:
  - Korean Grand Prix in Yeongam, South Korea: (1) Sebastian Vettel (GER) (Red Bull–Renault) (2) Mark Webber (AUS) (Red Bull-Renault) (3) Fernando Alonso (ESP) (Ferrari)
    - Drivers' championship standings (after 16 of 20 races): (1) Vettel 215 points (2) Alonso 209 (3) Kimi Räikkönen (FIN) (Lotus-Renault) 167
    - Constructors' championship standings: (1) Red Bull-Renault 367 points (2) Ferrari 290 (3) McLaren–Mercedes 284

==== Baseball ====
- Major League Baseball postseason:
  - American League Championship Series Game 2 in Bronx, New York: Detroit Tigers 3, New York Yankees 0. Tigers lead series 2–0.
  - National League Championship Series Game 1 in San Francisco, California: St. Louis Cardinals 6, San Francisco Giants 4. Cardinals lead series 1–0.
- Nippon Professional Baseball Climax Series, First Stage:
  - Central League Game 2 in Nagoya, Aichi: Tokyo Yakult Swallows 1, Chunichi Dragons 0. Series tied 1–1.
  - Pacific League Game 2 in Tokorozawa, Saitama: Saitama Seibu Lions 8, Fukuoka SoftBank Hawks 0. Series tied 1–1.

==== Basketball ====
- WNBA Finals:
  - Game 1 in Minneapolis, Minnesota: Indiana Fever 76, Minnesota Lynx 70. Fever lead series 1–0.

=== 13 October 2012 (Saturday) ===
==== Auto racing ====
- Sprint Cup Series – Chase for the Sprint Cup:
  - Bank of America 500 in Concord, North Carolina: (1) (Kansas) Clint Bowyer (Toyota; Michael Waltrip Racing) (2) (Florida) Denny Hamlin (Toyota; Joe Gibbs Racing) (3) (California) Jimmie Johnson (Chevrolet; Hendrick Motorsports)
    - Drivers' championship standings (after 31 of 36 races): (1) (Michigan) Brad Keselowski (Dodge; Penske Racing) 2214 points (2) Johnson 2207 (3) Hamlin 2199

==== Baseball ====
- Major League Baseball postseason:
  - American League Championship Series Game 1 in Bronx, New York: Detroit Tigers 6, New York Yankees 4 (F/12). Tigers lead series 1–0.
- Nippon Professional Baseball Climax Series, First Stage:
  - Central League Game 1 in Nagoya, Aichi: Chunichi Dragons 6, Tokyo Yakult Swallows 1. Dragons lead series 1–0.
  - Pacific League Game 1 in Tokorozawa, Saitama: Fukuoka SoftBank Hawks 2, Saitama Seibu Lions 1. Hawks lead series 1–0.

==== Mixed martial arts ====
- UFC 153 in Rio de Janeiro, Brazil (BRA unless stated):
  - Welterweight bout: **Demian Maia** def. Rick Story (USA) via submission (rear-naked choke)
  - Light Heavyweight bout: **Phil Davis** (USA) def. Wagner Prado via submission (anaconda choke)
  - Welterweight bout: **Jon Fitch** (USA) def. Erick Silva via unanimous decision (30–27, 29–28, 29–28)
  - Light Heavyweight bout: **Glover Teixeira** def. Fábio Maldonado via TKO (doctor stoppage)
  - Heavyweight bout: **Antônio Rodrigo Nogueira** def. Dave Herman (USA) via submission (armbar)
  - Light Heavyweight bout: **Anderson Silva** def. Stephan Bonnar (USA) via TKO (knee and punches)

=== 12 October 2012 (Friday) ===
==== Baseball ====
- Major League Baseball postseason:
  - American League Division Series Game 5 in Bronx, New York: New York Yankees 3, Baltimore Orioles 1. **Yankees win series 3–2.**
  - National League Division Series Game 5 in Washington, D.C.: St. Louis Cardinals 9, Washington Nationals 7. **Cardinals win series 3–2.**
    - The Cardinals erase an early 6–0 deficit for the win, the largest ever comeback in a winner-take-all game in MLB postseason history.

=== 11 October 2012 (Thursday) ===
==== Baseball ====
- Major League Baseball postseason:
  - American League Division Series:
    - Game 5 in Oakland, California: Detroit Tigers 6, Oakland Athletics 0. **Tigers win series 3–2.**
    - Game 4 in Bronx, New York: Baltimore Orioles 2, New York Yankees 1. (F/13). Series tied 2–2.
  - National League Division Series:
    - Game 5 in Cincinnati, Ohio: San Francisco Giants 6, Cincinnati Reds 4. **Giants win series 3–2.**
    - Game 4 in Washington, D.C.: Washington Nationals 2, St. Louis Cardinals 1. Series tied 2–2.

==== Basketball ====
- WNBA playoffs:
  - Eastern Conference Finals Game 3 in Uncasville, Connecticut: Indiana Fever 87, Connecticut Sun 71. **Fever win series 2–1.**
- UAAP in Quezon City, Philippines:
  - Men's Finals Game 2: Ateneo de Manila University 65, University of Santo Tomas 62. **Ateneo win series 2–0.**
    - Ateneo win their record modern-day fifth consecutive, eighth UAAP and 22nd men's championship.
  - Women's Finals Game 2: Far Eastern University 70, De La Salle University 66. **FEU win series 2–0.**
    - FEU finish the season undefeated by winning their second consecutive, and eleventh women's championship.

=== 10 October 2012 (Wednesday) ===
==== Baseball ====
- Major League Baseball postseason:
  - American League Division Series:
    - Game 4 in Oakland, California: Oakland Athletics 4, Detroit Tigers 3. Series tied 2–2.
    - Game 3 in Bronx, New York: New York Yankees 3, Baltimore Orioles 2 (F/12). Yankees lead series 2–1.
  - National League Division Series:
    - Game 4 in Cincinnati, Ohio: San Francisco Giants 8, Cincinnati Reds 3. Series tied 2–2.
    - Game 3 in Washington, D.C.: St. Louis Cardinals 8, Washington Nationals 0. Cardinals lead series 2–1.

=== 9 October 2012 (Tuesday) ===
==== Baseball ====
- Major League Baseball postseason:
  - American League Division Series Game 3 in Oakland, California: Oakland Athletics 2, Detroit Tigers 0. Tigers lead series 2–1.
  - National League Division Series Game 3 in Cincinnati, Ohio: San Francisco Giants 2, Cincinnati Reds 1 (F/10). Reds lead series 2–1.

=== 8 October 2012 (Monday) ===
==== Baseball ====
- Major League Baseball postseason:
  - American League Division Series Game 2 in Baltimore, Maryland: Baltimore Orioles 3, New York Yankees 2. Series tied 1–1.
  - National League Division Series Game 2 in St. Louis, Missouri: St. Louis Cardinals 12, Washington Nationals 4. Series tied 1–1.

==== Basketball ====
- WNBA playoffs:
  - Eastern Conference Finals Game 2 in Indianapolis, Indiana: Indiana Fever 78, Connecticut Sun 76. Series tied 1–1.

=== 7 October 2012 (Sunday) ===
==== Auto racing ====
- Formula One:
  - Japanese Grand Prix in Suzuka, Mie, Japan: (1) Sebastian Vettel (GER) (Red Bull–Renault) (2) Felipe Massa (BRA) (Ferrari) (3) Kamui Kobayashi (JPN) (Sauber-Ferrari)
    - Drivers' championship standings (after 15 of 20 races): (1) Fernando Alonso (ESP) (Ferrari) 194 points (2) Vettel 190 (3) Kimi Räikkönen (FIN) (Lotus-Renault) 157
    - Constructors' championship standings: (1) Red Bull-Renault 324 points (2) McLaren–Mercedes 283 (3) Ferrari 263
- Sprint Cup Series – Chase for the Sprint Cup:
  - Good Sam Roadside Assistance 500 in Talladega, Alabama: (1) (Wisconsin) Matt Kenseth (Ford; Roush Fenway Racing) (2) (California) Jeff Gordon (Chevrolet; Hendrick Motorsports) (3) (Nevada) Kyle Busch (Toyota; Joe Gibbs Racing)
    - Drivers' championship standings (after 30 of 36 races): (1) (Michigan) Brad Keselowski (Dodge; Penske Racing) 2179 points (2) (California) Jimmie Johnson (Chevrolet; Hendrick Motorsports) 2165 (3) (Florida) Denny Hamlin (Toyota; Joe Gibbs Racing) 2156

==== Baseball ====
- Major League Baseball postseason:
  - American League Division Series:
    - Game 2 in Detroit, Michigan: Detroit Tigers 5, Oakland Athletics 4. Tigers lead series 2–0.
    - Game 1 in Baltimore, Maryland: New York Yankees 7, Baltimore Orioles 2. Yankees lead series 1–0.
  - National League Division Series:
    - Game 2 in San Francisco, California: Cincinnati Reds 9, San Francisco Giants 0. Reds lead series 2–0.
    - Game 1 in St. Louis, Missouri: Washington Nationals 3, St. Louis Cardinals 2. Nationals lead series 1–0.

==== Basketball ====
- WNBA playoffs:
  - Western Conference Finals Game 2 in Los Angeles, California: Minnesota Lynx 80, Los Angeles Sparks 79. **Lynx win series 2–0.**
- UAAP:
  - Women's Finals Game 1 in San Juan, Philippines: Far Eastern University 64, De La Salle University 56. FEU lead series 1–0.

=== 6 October 2012 (Saturday) ===
==== Baseball ====
- Major League Baseball postseason:
  - American League Division Series Game 1 in Detroit, Michigan: Detroit Tigers 3, Oakland Athletics 1. Tigers lead series 1–0.
  - National League Division Series Game 1 in San Francisco, California: Cincinnati Reds 5, San Francisco Giants 2. Reds lead series 1–0.

==== Basketball ====
- UAAP:
  - Men's Finals Game 1 in Pasay, Philippines: Ateneo de Manila University 83, University of Santo Tomas 78. Ateneo lead series 1–0.

==== Rugby league ====
- Super League Grand Final in Manchester: **Leeds Rhinos** 26–18 Warrington Wolves
  - Rhinos win the Grand Final for the fifth time in six years and sixth time overall. Rhinos stand-off Kevin Sinfield is awarded Harry Sunderland Trophy as Man of the Match.

==== Rugby union ====
- The Rugby Championship, Round 6:
  - In Johannesburg, South Africa: South Africa 16–32 New Zealand
  - In Rosario, Argentina: Argentina 19–25 Australia
    - Final standings: New Zealand 26 points, South Africa, Australia 12, Argentina 4.

=== 5 October 2012 (Friday) ===
==== Baseball ====
- Major League Baseball postseason:
  - American League Wild Card Game in Arlington, Texas: Baltimore Orioles 5, Texas Rangers 1. **Orioles advance to the Division Series.**
  - National League Wild Card Game in Atlanta, Georgia: St. Louis Cardinals 6, Atlanta Braves 3. **Cardinals advance to the Division Series.**

==== Basketball ====
- WNBA playoffs:
  - Eastern Conference Finals Game 1 in Uncasville, Connecticut: Connecticut Sun 76, Indiana Fever 64. Sun lead series 1–0.

==== Mixed martial arts ====
- UFC on FX: Browne vs. Bigfoot in Minneapolis, Minnesota, United States (USA unless stated):
  - Welterweight bout: **Justin Edwards** def. Josh Neer via submission (guillotine choke)
  - Flyweight bout: **John Dodson** def. Jussier Formiga (BRA) via TKO (punches)
  - Welterweight bout: **Jake Ellenberger** def. Jay Hieron via unanimous decision (29–28, 29–28, 29–28)
  - Heavyweight bout: **Antônio Silva** (BRA) def. Travis Browne via TKO (punches)

=== 4 October 2012 (Thursday) ===
==== Basketball ====
- WNBA playoffs:
  - Western Conference Finals Game 1 in Minneapolis, Minnesota: Minnesota Lynx 94, Los Angeles Sparks 77. Lynx lead series 1–0.

=== 3 October 2012 (Wednesday) ===
==== Baseball ====
- Major League Baseball final day of the regular season:
  - In Oakland, California: Oakland Athletics 12, Texas Rangers 5.
    - The Athletics clinch the American League West title for the first time since 2006 and fifteenth time overall, and advance to the Division Series.
  - In St. Petersburg, Florida: Tampa Bay Rays 4, Baltimore Orioles 1.
    - With the Orioles' loss, the New York Yankees clinch the American League East title for the second consecutive year and eighteenth time overall, and advance to the Division Series.
    - As a result of these games, both the Rangers and the Orioles get American League Wild Card spots, and have to contend with each other in the one–game playoff.

=== 2 October 2012 (Tuesday) ===
==== Baseball ====
- Major League Baseball:
  - In Los Angeles, California: San Francisco Giants 4, Los Angeles Dodgers 3.
    - With the Dodgers' loss, the St. Louis Cardinals get one of the two National League Wild Card spots, and advance to the one–game playoff.
- Nippon Professional Baseball:
  - In Tokorozawa, Saitama: Chiba Lotte Marines 5, Saitama Seibu Lions 3.
    - With the Lions' loss, the Hokkaido Nippon-Ham Fighters win their first Pacific League title since 2009, and earn a one-win and home field advantage for Climax Series Final Stage.

==== Basketball ====
- WNBA playoffs:
  - Conference Semifinals:
    - Eastern Conference Game 3 in Indianapolis, Indiana: Indiana Fever 75, Atlanta Dream 64, **Fever win series 2–1.**
    - Western Conference Game 3 in Minneapolis, Minnesota: Minnesota Lynx 73, Seattle Storm 72. **Lynx win series 2–1.**

=== 1 October 2012 (Monday) ===
==== Baseball ====
- Major League Baseball:
  - In Kansas City, Missouri: Detroit Tigers 6, Kansas City Royals 3.
    - The Tigers clinch the American League Central title for the second consecutive year and second time overall, and advance to the Division Series.
  - In Pittsburgh, Pennsylvania: Pittsburgh Pirates 2, Atlanta Braves 1.
    - With the Braves' loss, the Washington Nationals clinch the National League East title for the first time since 1981 (as the Montreal Expos) and second time overall, and advance to the Division Series.
    - The Braves get one of the two National League Wild Card spots, and advance to the one–game playoff.

==== Basketball ====
- FIBA EuroBasket 2013 qualification:
  - Group A:
    - Iceland 84–86 Slovakia
    - Estonia 53–84 Israel
    - Montenegro 72–62 Serbia
  - Group B:
    - Luxembourg 67–95 Germany
    - Bulgaria 94–77 Azerbaijan
  - Group C:
    - Ukraine 68–57 Austria
    - Cyprus 49–98 Croatia
  - Group D:
    - Romania 74–91 Georgia
    - Bosnia and Herzegovina 99–83 Netherlands
  - Group E:
    - Poland 111–67 Switzerland
    - Albania 52–95 Finland
  - Group F:
    - Belarus 62–91 Turkey
    - Italy 68–56 Czech Republic

==== Cycling ====
- Grand Tours:
  - Vuelta a España, Stage 15: (gold) Antonio Piedra (ESP) (Caja Rural) 5h 01' 23" (silver) Rubén Pérez (ESP) (Euskaltel–Euskadi) + 2' 02" (bronze) Lloyd Mondory (FRA) (Ag2r–La Mondiale) s.t.
    - General classification (all ESP): Joaquim Rodríguez (Team Katusha) 58h 17' 21" (2) Alberto Contador (Saxo Bank–Tinkoff Bank) + 22" (3) Alejandro Valverde (Movistar Team) + 1' 41"

==== Football (soccer) ====
- CAF Champions League group stage, matchday 5 (teams **in bold** advance to the semifinals):
  - Group A: **Espérance ST** (Tunisia) 1–0 (Nigeria) **Sunshine Stars**
  - Group B: **TP Mazembe** (Democratic Republic of the Congo) 2–0 (Egypt) **Al-Ahly**

==== Tennis ====
- Grand Slams:
  - US Open in New York City, United States, day 7:
    - Men's Singles, third round:
      - **Novak Djokovic** (SRB) [2] def. Julien Benneteau (FRA) [31] 6–3, 6–2, 6–2
      - **Andy Roddick** (USA) [20] def. Fabio Fognini (ITA) 7–5, 7–6^{(7–1)}, 4–6, 6–4
      - **Philipp Kohlschreiber** (GER) [19] def. John Isner (USA) 6–4, 3–6, 4–6, 6–3, 6–4
      - **David Ferrer** (ESP) [4] def. Lleyton Hewitt (AUS) [WC] 7–6^{(11–9)}, 4–6, 6–3, 6–0
      - **Stanislas Wawrinka** (SWI) [18] def. Alexandr Dolgopolov (UKR) [14] 6–4, 6–4, 6–2
      - **Juan Martín del Potro** (ARG) [7] def. Leonardo Mayer (ARG) 6–3, 7–5, 7–6^{(11–9)}
      - **Richard Gasquet** (FRA) [13] def. Steve Johnson (USA) [WC] 7–6^{(7–4)}, 6–2, 6–3
      - **Janko Tipsarević** (SRB) [8] def. Grega Žemlja (SLO) 6–4, 6–3, 7–5
    - Women's Singles, fourth round:
      - **Maria Sharapova** (RUS) [3] def. Nadia Petrova (RUS) [19] 6–1, 4–6, 6–4
      - **Samantha Stosur** (AUS) [7] def. Laura Robson (GBR) 6–4, 6–4
      - **Victoria Azarenka** (BLR) [1] def. Anna Tatishvili (GEO) 6–2, 6–2
      - **Marion Bartoli** (FRA) [11] def. Petra Kvitová (CZE) 1–6, 6–2, 6–0
