= 2012–13 Four Hills Tournament =

Ski jumping competition

Four Hills Tournament at the 2012–13 FIS Ski Jumping World Cup
- Venue: Schattenbergschanze, Große Olympiaschanze, Bergiselschanze, Paul-Ausserleitner-Schanze
- Location: Austria, Germany
- Dates: 30 December 2012 – 6 January 2013

Medalists
gold medal	(Austria) Gregor Schlierenzauer
silver medal	(Norway) Anders Jacobsen
bronze medal	(Norway) Tom Hilde

The 2012–13 Four Hills Tournament took place at the four traditional venues of Oberstdorf, Garmisch-Partenkirchen, Innsbruck, and Bischofshofen, located in Germany and Austria, between 30 December 2012 and 6 January 2013.

== Results ==
=== Oberstdorf ===
HS 137 Schattenbergschanze, Germany
30 December 2012

Rank	Name	Nationality	Jump 1 (m)	Jump 2 (m)	Points
1	Anders Jacobsen	Norway	138.0	139.0	308.6
2	Gregor Schlierenzauer	Austria	134.5	138.5	297.0
3	Severin Freund	Germany	138.5	135.5	290.8
4	Dimitry Vassiliev	Russia	137.5	138.5	282.6
5	Tom Hilde	Norway	135.5	138.5	281.3
6	Simon Ammann	Switzerland	133.5	139.0	280.3
7	Manuel Fettner	Austria	136.5	131.0	278.7
8	Michael Neumayer	Germany	136.5	134.5	274.7
9	Rune Velta	Norway	132.5	134.5	272.8
10	Andreas Wellinger	Germany	131.0	127.0	272.4

=== Garmisch-Partenkirchen ===
HS 137 Große Olympiaschanze, Germany
1 January 2013

Rank	Name	Nationality	Jump 1 (m)	Jump 2 (m)	Points
1	Anders Jacobsen	Norway	131.0	143.0	277.7
2	Gregor Schlierenzauer	Austria	134.0	136.5	276.8
3	Anders Bardal	Norway	136.5	135.5	267.2
4	Tom Hilde	Norway	133.5	138.0	266.4
5	Maciej Kot	Poland	134.5	135.0	265.7
6	Kamil Stoch	Poland	142.0	131.5	261.8
6	Dimitry Vassiliev	Russia	132.5	132.0	261.8
8	Jaka Hvala	Slovenia	136.0	130.0	254.2
9	Andreas Wellinger	Germany	133.0	131.5	253.0
10	Peter Prevc	Slovenia	131.5	131.0	252.6

=== Innsbruck ===
HS 130 Bergiselschanze, Austria
4 January 2013

Rank	Name	Nationality	Jump 1 (m)	Jump 2 (m)	Points
1	Gregor Schlierenzauer	Austria	131.5	123.0	253.7
2	Kamil Stoch	Poland	124.5	123.0	240.9
3	Anders Bardal	Norway	125.0	120.0	235.4
4	Severin Freund	Germany	125.0	120.5	234.4
5	Peter Prevc	Slovenia	124.0	121.5	232.3
6	Tom Hilde	Norway	121.5	123.0	230.6
7	Anders Jacobsen	Norway	127.0	117.5	230.5
8	Lukaš Hlava	Czech Republic	120.0	122.5	227.9
9	Maciej Kot	Poland	121.5	119.0	226.7
10	Martin Koch	Austria	121.5	121.5	226.6

=== Bischofshofen ===
HS 140 Paul-Ausserleitner-Schanze, Austria
6 January 2013

Rank	Name	Nationality	Jump 1 (m)	Jump 2 (m)	Points
1	Gregor Schlierenzauer	Austria	133.0	137.5	272.7
2	Anders Jacobsen	Norway	131.5	139.0	270.4
3	Stefan Kraft	Austria	131.0	131.0	261.3
4	Kamil Stoch	Poland	131.0	131.5	260.2
5	Anders Bardal	Norway	130.0	130.0	257.3
6	Thomas Morgenstern	Austria	132.0	127.0	253.7
7	Dimitry Vassiliev	Russia	132.0	130.5	252.9
8	Michael Neumayer	Germany	132.0	128.5	251.5
9	Tom Hilde	Norway	126.5	131.0	250.9
10	Maciej Kot	Poland	132.0	126.0	250.8

== Overall standings ==
The final standings after all four events:

Rank	Name	Nationality	Oberstdorf	Garmisch- Partenkirchen	Innsbruck	Bischofshofen	Total Points
1st place, gold medalist(s)	Gregor Schlierenzauer	Austria	297.0 (2)	276.8 (2)	253.7 (1)	272.7 (1)	1,100.2
2nd place, silver medalist(s)	Anders Jacobsen	Norway	308.6 (1)	277.7 (1)	230.5 (7)	270.4 (2)	1,087.2
3rd place, bronze medalist(s)	Tom Hilde	Norway	281.3 (5)	266.4 (4)	230.6 (6)	250.9 (9)	1,029.2
4	Kamil Stoch	Poland	264.3 (13)	261.8 (6)	240.9 (2)	260.2 (4)	1,027.2
5	Anders Bardal	Norway	266.9 (11)	267.2 (3)	235.4 (3)	257.3 (5)	1,026.8
6	Michael Neumayer	Germany	274.6 (8)	246.1 (21)	224.5 (13)	251.5 (8)	996.7
7	Dimitry Vassiliev	Russia	282.6 (4)	261.8 (6)	197.5 (30)	252.9 (7)	994.8
8	Peter Prevc	Slovenia	259.8 (18)	252.6 (10)	232.3 (5)	245.2 (15)	989.9
9	Andreas Wellinger	Germany	272.4 (10)	253.0 (9)	220.1 (21)	243.2 (19)	988.7
10	Martin Schmitt	Germany	263.6 (16)	252.0 (14)	225.4 (12)	239.8 (24)	980.8
