= Pakistani cricket team in India in 2012–13 =

International cricket tour

Pakistan cricket team in India in 2012–13
	India	Pakistan
- Dates: 25 December 2012 – 6 January 2013
Captains	MS Dhoni	Misbah-ul-Haq (ODI); Mohammad Hafeez (T20)

One Day International series
- Results: Pakistan won the 3-match series 2–1
Most runs	MS Dhoni (203)	Nasir Jamshed (241)
Most wickets	Ishant Sharma (7)	Saeed Ajmal (8); Junaid Khan (8)
- Player of the series: Nasir Jamshed (Pak)

Twenty20 International series
- Results: 2-match series drawn 1–1
Most runs	Yuvraj Singh (82)	Mohammad Hafeez (116)
Most wickets	Ashok Dinda (4); Bhuvneshwar Kumar (4)	Umar Gul (7)
- Player of the series: Mohammad Hafeez (Pak)

The Pakistan cricket team toured India from 25 December 2012 to 6 January 2013. The tour consisted of three One Day International, and two Twenty20 International matches. This was Pakistan's first cricket tour of India in five years. Several photography agencies, including Getty Images, have been barred from taking pictures following a dispute with the Board of Control for Cricket in India. The Twenty20 series was drawn 1–1; Pakistan won the ODI series 2–1. As of 2026, this is the last bilateral series to have taken place between the two nations.

== Squads ==
One Day Internationals		Twenty20 Internationals	
India	Pakistan	India	Pakistan
MS Dhoni (c, wk); Virender Sehwag; Gautam Gambhir; Virat Kohli; Yuvraj Singh; Rohit Sharma; Suresh Raina; Ravindra Jadeja; Ravichandran Ashwin; Ishant Sharma; Ajinkya Rahane; Ashok Dinda; Bhuvneshwar Kumar; Mohammed Shami; Amit Mishra	Misbah-ul-Haq (c); Nasir Jamshed; Mohammad Hafeez; Younus Khan; Kamran Akmal (wk); Shoaib Malik ^{1}; Haris Sohail; Umar Akmal; Saeed Ajmal; Wahab Riaz; Junaid Khan; Umar Gul; Imran Farhat; Azhar Ali; Mohammad Irfan ^{1}; Anwar Ali; Zulfiqar Babar	MS Dhoni (c, wk); Gautam Gambhir; Ajinkya Rahane; Yuvraj Singh; Rohit Sharma; Suresh Raina; Virat Kohli; Ravindra Jadeja; Ravichandran Ashwin; Ashok Dinda; Ishant Sharma; Bhuvneshwar Kumar; Parvinder Awana; Piyush Chawla; Ambati Rayudu	Mohammad Hafeez (c); Shahid Afridi; Nasir Jamshed; Kamran Akmal (wk); Ahmed Shehzad; Asad Ali; Umar Akmal; Shoaib Malik; Saeed Ajmal; Mohammad Irfan; Sohail Tanvir; Umar Gul; Junaid Khan; Zulfiqar Babar; Umar Amin

^{1} Shoaib Malik and Mohammad Irfan were retained in the ODI squad on the basis of performing well in T20I series.

== T20I series ==
=== 1st T20I ===
25 December 2012
19:00 (D/N)
Scorecard

India; 133/9 (20 overs)	v	Pakistan; 134/5 (19.4 overs)
Gautam Gambhir 43 (41); Umar Gul 3/21 (3 overs)		Mohammad Hafeez 61 (44); Bhuvneshwar Kumar 3/9 (4 overs)

Pakistan won by 5 wickets
M. Chinnaswamy Stadium, Bangalore
Umpires: S. Ravi (Ind) and Chettithody Shamshuddin (Ind)
Player of the match: Mohammad Hafeez (Pak)

- Pakistan won the toss and elected to bowl.
- Bhuvneshwar Kumar (India) and Mohammad Irfan (Pakistan) made their Twenty20 International debuts.
- Mohammad Hafeez and Shoaib Malik added together 106 runs and made the highest 4th wicket partnership breaking the previous record of 101 runs set by Shoaib Malik and Younis Khan in 2007 World Twenty20 against Sri Lanka.
- This was Pakistan's first win against India in Twenty20 Internationals.

=== 2nd T20I ===
28 December 2012
17:00 (D/N)
Scorecard

India; 192/5 (20 overs)	v	Pakistan; 181/7 (20 overs)
Yuvraj Singh 72 (36); Umar Gul 4/37 (4 overs)		Mohammad Hafeez 55 (26); Ashok Dinda 3/36 (4 overs)

India won by 11 runs
Sardar Patel Stadium, Ahmedabad
Umpires: Sudhir Asnani (Ind) and Vineet Kulkarni (Ind)
Player of the match: Yuvraj Singh (Ind)

- Pakistan won the toss and elected to field.
- Gautam Gambhir and Ashok Dinda played their last Twenty20 International.

== ODI series ==
=== 1st ODI ===
30 December 2012
14:00
Scorecard

India; 227/6 (50 overs)	v	Pakistan; 228/4 (48.1 overs)
MS Dhoni 113* (125); Junaid Khan 4/43 (9 overs)		Nasir Jamshed 101* (132); Bhuvneshwar Kumar 2/27 (9 overs)

Pakistan won by 6 wickets
M. A. Chidambaram Stadium, Chennai
Umpires: S. Ravi (Ind) and Billy Bowden (NZ)
Player of the match: MS Dhoni (Ind)

- Pakistan won the toss and elected to field
- Match start delayed due to wet field conditions
- ODI debut : Bhuvneshwar Kumar (Ind)

=== 2nd ODI ===
3 January 2013
12:00 (D/N)
Scorecard

Pakistan; 250 (48.3 overs)	v	India; 165 (48 overs)
Nasir Jamshed 106 (124); Ishant Sharma 3/34 (9.3 overs)		MS Dhoni 54* (89); Saeed Ajmal 3/20 (10 overs)

Pakistan won by 85 runs
Eden Gardens, Calcutta
Umpires: Billy Bowden (NZ) and Vineet Kulkarni (Ind)
Player of the match: Nasir Jamshed (Pak)

- India won the toss and elected to field
- This was Virender Sehwag's last ODI match.

=== 3rd ODI ===
6 January 2013
12:00 (D/N)
Scorecard

India; 167 (43.5 overs)	v	Pakistan; 157 (48.4 overs)
MS Dhoni 36 (55); Saeed Ajmal 5/24 (9.4 overs)		Misbah-ul-Haq 39 (82); Ishant Sharma 3/36 (9.5 overs)

India won by 10 runs
Feroz Shah Kotla Ground, Delhi
Umpires: Sudhir Asnani (Ind) and Billy Bowden (NZ)
Player of the match: MS Dhoni (Ind)

- India won the toss and elected to bat
- ODI debut : Mohammed Shami

== Broadcasters ==
Country	TV Broadcaster(s)
Australia	Fox Sports
United Kingdom	Sky Sports
Pakistan	PTV Sports
India	STAR Cricket
South Africa	SuperSport
