= 2012 Louisiana Tech Bulldogs football team =

American college football season

2012 Louisiana Tech Bulldogs football
- Conference: Western Athletic Conference
- Record: 9–3 (4–2 WAC)
- Head coach: Sonny Dykes (3rd season)
- Offensive coordinator: Tony Franklin (3rd season)
- Offensive scheme: Air raid
- Defensive coordinator: Tommy Spangler (6th season)
- Base defense: 4–2–5
- Captains: Quinton Patton; Colby Cameron; Stephen Warner; IK Enemkpali; Solomon Randle; Chad Boyd
- Home stadium: Joe Aillet Stadium; Independence Stadium

2012 Western Athletic Conference football standings
	Conf.			Overall
Team	W		L	W		L
No. 16 Utah State $	6	–	0	11	–	2
No. 21 San Jose State	5	–	1	11	–	2
Louisiana Tech	4	–	2	9	–	3
UTSA *	3	–	3	8	–	4
Texas State *	2	–	4	4	–	8
Idaho	1	–	5	1	–	11
New Mexico State	0	–	6	1	–	11
$ – Conference champion; * Texas State and UTSA were not eligible for conference title or bowl games as part of their transition to the FBS.; Rankings from AP Poll

The 2012 Louisiana Tech Bulldogs football team represented Louisiana Tech University as a member of the Western Athletic Conference (WAC) during the 2012 NCAA Division I FBS football season. Led by third-year head coach Sonny Dykes, the Bulldogs played five of their six home games at Joe Aillet Stadium in Ruston, Louisiana and one at Independence Stadium in Shreveport, Louisiana. The Bulldogs finished the season 9–3 overall and 4–2 in conference play to place third in the WAC. Despite having one of the most successful seasons in program history, the Bulldogs did not play in a bowl game. They were initially invited to the Independence Bowl, but asked for more time to decide to see if other options opened up. No other bowl invited them, and the Independence Bowl selected Ohio instead.

This was the Bulldogs last season as members of the WAC as they joined Conference USA in 2013.

== Before the season ==
=== Recruiting ===
Four student-athletes in Louisiana Tech's 2012 signing class were already enrolled at Tech prior to signing day. After signing with Louisiana Tech on National Signing Day in 2011, running back Tevin King was finally declared eligible by the NCAA after waiting out the 2011 season, and his scholarship will count towards Tech's 2012 signing class. On November 24, 2011, Sonny Dykes announced that four walk-on players would be receiving football scholarships which count towards the 2012 signing class. These players earning football scholarships include wide receiver D.J. Banks, defensive back Craig Johnson, running back Hunter Lee, and wide receiver Hayden Slack.

College recruiting (2012)
Name	Hometown	School	Height	Weight	Commit date
Adairius Barnes; ATH	Port Gibson, MS	Port Gibson HS	5 ft 11 in (1.80 m)	176 lb (80 kg)	Feb 1, 2012
Adairius Barnes; ATH	Recruit ratings: Scout: Rivals: 247Sports: ESPN:				
Kentrell Brice; DB	Ruston, LA	Ruston HS	5 ft 11 in (1.80 m)	173 lb (78 kg)	Jan 28, 2012
Kentrell Brice; DB	Recruit ratings: Scout: Rivals: 247Sports: ESPN:				
Darrell Brown; OL	Abilene, TX	Cooper HS	6 ft 5 in (1.96 m)	240 lb (110 kg)	Jan 28, 2012
Darrell Brown; OL	Recruit ratings: Scout: Rivals: 247Sports:				
Vernon Butler; DL	Summit, MS	North Pike HS	6 ft 3 in (1.91 m)	295 lb (134 kg)	Jan 8, 2012
Vernon Butler; DL	Recruit ratings: Scout: Rivals: 247Sports:				
Grant Childress; WR	Tyler, TX	Grace Community School	6 ft 1 in (1.85 m)	179 lb (81 kg)	Jan 29, 2012
Grant Childress; WR	Recruit ratings: Scout: Rivals: 247Sports: ESPN:				
Alec Davis; OL	Mission Viejo, CA	Orange Coast College	6 ft 1 in (1.85 m)	275 lb (125 kg)	Jan 6, 2012
Alec Davis; OL	Recruit ratings: Scout: Rivals: 247Sports:				
Jaydrick DeClouet; WR	Patterson, LA	Patterson HS	6 ft 0 in (1.83 m)	165 lb (75 kg)	Jan 25, 2012
Jaydrick DeClouet; WR	Recruit ratings: Scout: Rivals: 247Sports: ESPN:				
Kenneth Dixon; RB	Strong, AR	Strong HS	6 ft 0 in (1.83 m)	211 lb (96 kg)	Oct 16, 2011
Kenneth Dixon; RB	Recruit ratings: Scout: Rivals: 247Sports: ESPN:				
Stephen Gibson; DL	Marrero, LA	Archbishop Shaw HS	6 ft 4 in (1.93 m)	229 lb (104 kg)	Dec 9, 2011
Stephen Gibson; DL	Recruit ratings: Scout: Rivals: 247Sports: ESPN:				
Jon Greenwalt; WR	Wildomar, CA	Riverside City College	6 ft 3 in (1.91 m)	200 lb (91 kg)	Jan 6, 2012
Jon Greenwalt; WR	Recruit ratings: Scout: Rivals: 247Sports:				
Richard Greenwalt; OL	Wildomar, CA	Riverside City College	6 ft 4 in (1.93 m)	297 lb (135 kg)	Jan 19, 2012
Richard Greenwalt; OL	Recruit ratings: Scout: Rivals: 247Sports:				
Lloyd Grogan; DB	Morgan City, LA	Central Catholic HS	6 ft 0 in (1.83 m)	201 lb (91 kg)	Jan 15, 2012
Lloyd Grogan; DB	Recruit ratings: Scout: Rivals: 247Sports: ESPN:				
Ryan Higgins; QB	Hutto, TX	Hutto HS	6 ft 1 in (1.85 m)	196 lb (89 kg)	Jun 15, 2011
Ryan Higgins; QB	Recruit ratings: Scout: Rivals: 247Sports: ESPN:				
Ross Lodge; OL	Austin, TX	Westwood HS	6 ft 5 in (1.96 m)	292 lb (132 kg)	Jan 29, 2012
Ross Lodge; OL	Recruit ratings: Scout: Rivals: 247Sports:				
Thaddaeus Medford; ATH	Newbern, TN	Dyer County HS	5 ft 10 in (1.78 m)	179 lb (81 kg)	Feb 24, 2012
Thaddaeus Medford; ATH	Recruit ratings: No ratings found				
Tra'vez Taylor; DB	McComb, MS	North Pike HS	6 ft 0 in (1.83 m)	172 lb (78 kg)	Jan 8, 2012
Tra'vez Taylor; DB	Recruit ratings: Scout: Rivals: 247Sports:				
Overall recruit ranking:
Note: In many cases, Scout, Rivals, 247Sports, On3, and ESPN may conflict in their listings of height and weight.; In these cases, the average was taken. ESPN grades are on a 100-point scale.; Sources: "ESPN". ESPN.; "2012 Team Ranking". Rivals.com.

=== Death of Tyrone Duplessis ===
Early on the morning of February 2, 2012, Louisiana Tech redshirt sophomore running back Tyrone Duplessis awoke in distress at his off-campus apartment in Ruston, Louisiana. He reportedly sprung to a seated position in bed, pounded himself in the chest, and fell backward, never to rise again. He arrived at Northern Louisiana Medical Center before 5:00 a.m. and was pronounced dead shortly thereafter. The autopsy report showed Duplessis suffered a massive heart attack. Toxicology reports came back negative with no drugs or alcohol found. On February 10, approximately 1,000 people celebrated the life of Duplessis at a memorial service at the Thomas Assembly Center on the Louisiana Tech University campus. The funeral was held on February 11 at the L. B. Landry High School auditorium in New Orleans. The Tyrone Duplessis Memorial Fund was established with the Louisiana Tech Foundation.

=== T–Day spring game ===
T–Day spring game

Team	1	2	3	4	Total
• White	14	20	13	7	54
Blue	14	3	3	5	25

- Date: April 14
- Location: Joe Aillet Stadium, Ruston, LA
- Game start: 1:00 p.m.
- Elapsed time: 1:35
- Game attendance: 5,275
- Game weather: 80 °F (27 °C), sunny, winds 5 mph (8.0 km/h)

Scoring summary
1	13:16	White	Myles White 11-yard pass from Colby Cameron (Matt Nelson kick)	White 0–7
1	6:22	White	Myles White 45-yard pass from Colby Cameron (Matt Nelson kick)	White 0–14
2	12:09	White	Scott Cathcart 15-yard pass from Zach Griffith (John Hinton kick)	White 0–21
2	6:33	White	Tevin King 9-yard run (Matt Nelson kick)	White 0–28
2	2:55	White	Marlon Seets 67-yard run (John Hinton kick failed)	White 0–34
3	7:54	White	Brandon Adams 4-yard run (C. Vercher kick failed)	White 0–40
3	1:38	White	Cooper Lewis 4-yard pass from Zach Griffith (John Hinton kick)	White 0–47
4	12:40	White	D.J. Banks 80-yard pass from Zach Griffith (John Hinton kick)	White 0–54

The T–Day spring game was held at Joe Aillet Stadium on April 14, 2012.

== Schedule ==
Date	Time	Opponent	Rank	Site	TV	Result	Attendance
September 8	7:00 pm	at Houston*		Robertson Stadium; Houston, TX	CBSSN	W 56–49	29,142
September 15	6:00 pm	Rice*		Joe Aillet Stadium; Ruston, LA	ESPN3	W 56–37	23,228
September 22	7:00 pm	at Illinois*		Memorial Stadium; Champaign, IL	BTN	W 52–24	46,539
September 29	2:30 pm	at Virginia*		Scott Stadium; Charlottesville, VA	ESPN3	W 44–38	42,027
October 6	6:00 pm	UNLV*		Joe Aillet Stadium; Ruston, LA	ESPN Plus	W 58–31	21,850
October 13	8:15 pm	No. 22 Texas A&M*	No. 23	Independence Stadium; Shreveport, LA	ESPNU	L 57–59	40,453
October 20	6:00 pm	Idaho		Joe Aillet Stadium; Ruston, LA	ESPN Plus	W 70–28	20,255
October 27	7:00 pm	at New Mexico State	No. 24	Aggie Memorial Stadium; Las Cruces, NM	CSNH/ESPN3	W 28–14	12,118
November 3	3:00 pm	UTSA^{†}	No. 22	Joe Aillet Stadium; Ruston, LA	ESPN Plus	W 51–27	23,645
November 10	6:00 pm	at Texas State	No. 19	Bobcat Stadium; San Marcos, TX	LHN	W 62–55	17,184
November 17	3:00 pm	Utah State	No. 19	Joe Aillet Stadium; Ruston, LA	ESPN3	L 41–48 ^{OT}	25,614
November 24	9:30 pm	at San Jose State		Spartan Stadium; San Jose, CA	ESPN2	L 43–52	12,326
*Non-conference game; ^{†}Homecoming; Rankings from AP Poll released prior to the game; All times are in Central time

== Rankings ==
Ranking movements Legend: ██ Increase in ranking ██ Decrease in ranking — = Not ranked RV = Received votes
	Week															
Poll	Pre	1	2	3	4	5	6	7	8	9	10	11	12	13	14	Final
AP	RV	—	—	—	RV	RV	23	RV	24	22	19	19	RV	—	—	—
Coaches	RV	RV	RV	RV	RV	RV	24	RV	RV	23	18	19	RV	RV	RV	RV
Harris	Not released						24	RV	RV	24	19	20	RV	RV	RV	Not released
BCS	Not released							—	—	25	20	20	—	—	—	Not released

*Source: ESPN.com: 2012 NCAA Football Rankings

== Roster ==
2012 Louisiana Tech Bulldogs football team roster
Players
Coaches
Offense

Pos.	#	Name	Class
WR	1	Richie Casey	Sr
RB	2	Lyle Fitte	Sr
WR	2	Jaydrick DeClouette	Fr
QB	3	Tarik Hakmi	Sr
WR	4	Quinton Patton	Sr
WR	5	D.J. Banks	Jr
WR	7	Myles White	Sr
WR	8	Jacarri Jackson	Jr
QB	9	Zach Griffith	So
QB	10	Colby Cameron	Sr
QB	14	Ryan Higgins	Fr
WR	15	Hayden Slack	Sr
QB	16	Scotty Young	So
QB	17	Andy McAlindon	So
WR	18	D.J. St. Julien	So
WR	18	Mark Harrington	Jr
WR	19	Andrew Guillot	Sr
WR	19	R.P. Stuart	Sr
RB	21	Marlon Seets	So
RB	25	Blake Martin	Fr
RB	26	Tevin King	Fr
RB	27	James Banks	So
RB	28	Kenneth Dixon	Fr
RB	32	Ray Holley	Sr
RB	35	Jereme Lagarde	Jr
RB	35	Brandon Adams	So
RB	36	Hunter Lee	So
WR	37	Ben Dickerson	Sr
RB	38	Malon Lee	Sr
RB	46	Rickey Courtney	Jr
RB	47	Cooper Lewis	Fr
OL	57	Kevin Saia	Sr
OL	60	Ross Lodge	Fr
OL	61	Matthew Conger	Jr
OL	63	Stephen Warner	Sr
OL	64	Johnny Ginart	Fr
OL	65	Richard Greenwalt	Jr
OL	66	Matthew Shepherd	Jr
OL	67	Oscar Johnson	Sr
OL	68	Josh Robinson	Fr
OL	69	Vince Cano	Jr
OL	72	Jeremy Graffree	Sr
OL	73	Josh Parrish	Sr
OL	74	Larry Banks	Jr
OL	75	Darrell Brown	Fr
OL	76	Zeke Alsander	Fr
OL	77	Jens Danielson	So
OL	78	Jordan Mills	Sr
OL	79	Alec Davis	Jr
WR	80	Jon Greenwalt	Jr
WR	81	Scott Cathcart	Jr
WR	82	Travis Reyes	Jr
WR	82	Cody Stidham	Fr
WR	85	David Gru	Sr
TE	86	Giles Menard	Jr
WR	87	Grant Childress	Fr
WR	88	Ian Soignier	So
WR	89	Chandler Spence	Sr

Defense

Pos.	#	Name	Class
LB	6	Beau Fitte	Fr
DB	7	David Jones	Sr
DB	11	Lloyd Grogan	Fr
DB	13	Levander Liggins	So
DB	14	Craig Johnson	Sr
CB	15	Brice Abraham	Fr
DB	16	Jabari Prewitt	So
DB	17	Tra'Vez Taylor	Fr
DB	19	Ronnie Fields	So
DB	20	Jamel Johnson	Sr
DB	21	Adairius Barnes	Fr
DE	22	Kendrick James	Jr
DB	23	Kentrell Brice	Fr
CB	24	Dave Clark	Sr
DB	27	Quinn Giles	Sr
DB	29	Kendall Hayes	So
DB	30	Ahmad Wallace	Jr
DB	31	Chad Boyd	Sr
FS	34	Mike Schrang	So
S	38	Connor Nichols	So
LB	39	Warren Bates	Fr
LB	40	Kevin Kisseberth	So
DL	41	IK Enemkpali	Jr
LB	43	Chip Hester	Sr
DL	45	Vernon Butler	Fr
LB	46	Rufus Porter	Jr
S	47	Javontay Crowe	Sr
LB	48	Andre Wiggins	Fr
LB	50	Ches Morrison	So
LB	51	Riccie Gray	So
LB	52	Ty Hook	Fr
LB	55	Antonio Mitchum	Sr
LB	56	Solomon Randle	Sr
LB	58	Zachary Voss	Jr
LB	59	Mason Dean	Fr
DL	70	Justin Ellis	Jr
DL	84	Andre Taylor	So
DL	88	Tyler Porter	Fr
DL	92	Carter Street	So
DL	93	Stephen Gibson	Fr
DT	94	Shakeil Lucas	Jr
DL	95	Jon'al White	Sr
DL	97	Devon McKinney	Jr
DL	98	Vontarrius Dora	Fr
DL	99	Malcolm Pichon	Fr

Special teams

Pos.	#	Name	Class
ATH	25	Thaddaeus Medford	Fr
PK	33	Matt Nelson	Sr
DS	51	Josh Cuthbert	Jr
P	86	Ryan Allen	Sr

Head coach

- Sonny Dykes

Coordinators/assistant coaches

- Tony Franklin (offensive coordinator / quarterbacks)
- Tommy Spangler (defensive coordinator / safeties)
- Rob Likens (assistant head coach / wide receivers)
- Stan Eggen (defensive line / recruiting coordinator)
- Pierre Ingram (running backs)
- Jeff Koonz (linebackers)
- Kevin Curtis (cornerbacks)
- Petey Perot (offensive line)
- Mark Tommerdahl (special teams / inside receivers)
- Damon Harrington (strength and conditioning)
- Ed Jackson (Character education coordinator)
- Jacob Peeler (graduate assistant coach)
- Thomas Graham (graduate assistant coach)
- Hunter McWilliams (graduate assistant coach)

Legend

- (C) Team captain
- (S) Suspended
- (I) Ineligible
- Injured
- Redshirt

Roster
Last update: July 23, 2012

== Game summaries ==
=== At Houston ===
Louisiana Tech at Houston

Team	1	2	3	4	Total
• Bulldogs	14	7	21	14	56
Cougars	6	14	7	22	49

- Date: September 8
- Location: Robertson Stadium
  Houston, TX
- Game start: 7:04 p.m. CDT
- Elapsed time: 4:08
- Game attendance: 29,142
- Game weather: 85 °F (29 °C), partly cloudy, winds N 13 mph (21 km/h)
- Referee: Jim Farmer
- TV announcers (CBSSN): Dave Ryan (play-by-play), Ron Zook (color), Evan Washburn (sideline)

Scoring summary
1	12:07	LaTech	Tevin King 13-yard run (Matt Nelson kick)	LaTech 7–0
1	9:40	LaTech	Tevin King 9-yard run (Matt Nelson kick)	LaTech 14–0
1	6:19	HOU	Matt Hogan 30-yard field goal	LaTech 14–3
1	1:35	HOU	Matt Hogan 42-yard field goal	LaTech 14–6
2	13:34	LaTech	Jon Greenwalt 6-yard pass from Colby Cameron (Matt Nelson kick)	LaTech 21–6
2	4:28	HOU	Ronnie Williams 32-yard pass from David Piland (Matt Hogan kick)	LaTech 21–13
2	0:53	HOU	Charles Sims 2-yard run (Matt Hogan kick)	LaTech 21–20
3	10:40	LaTech	Tevin King 59-yard run (Matt Nelson kick)	LaTech 28–20
3	6:09	LaTech	Kenneth Dixon 2-yard run (Matt Nelson kick)	LaTech 35–20
3	5:52	HOU	Daniel Spencer 74-yard pass from David Piland (Matt Hogan kick)	LaTech 35–27
3	3:36	LaTech	Ray Holley 2-yard run (Matt Nelson kick)	LaTech 42–27
4	12:33	LaTech	Hunter Lee 8-yard pass from Colby Cameron (Matt Nelson kick)	LaTech 49–27
4	9:36	HOU	Charles Sims 1-yard run (Daniel Spencer pass from David Piland)	LaTech 49–35
4	6:36	LaTech	R.P. Stuart 14-yard pass from Colby Cameron (Matt Nelson kick)	LaTech 56–35
4	4:45	HOU	Dewayne Peace 7-yard pass from David Piland (Matt Hogan kick)	LaTech 56–42
4	0:35	HOU	Deontay Greenberry 12-yard pass from David Piland (Matt Hogan kick)	LaTech 56–49

Statistics	LT	HOU
First downs	38	40
Total yards	598	693
Rushing yards	245	113
Passing yards	353	580
Turnovers	0	2
Time of possession	28:07	31:53

Team	Category	Player	Statistics
Louisiana Tech	Passing	Colby Cameron	34/52, 353 yards, 3 TD
Louisiana Tech	Rushing	Tevin King	13 rushes, 112 yards, 3 TD
Louisiana Tech	Receiving	Myles White	5 receptions, 74 yards
Houston	Passing	David Piland	53/77, 580 yards, 4 TD
Houston	Rushing	Charles Sims	21 rushes, 65 yards, 2 TD
Houston	Receiving	Daniel Spencer	7 receptions, 157 yards, TD

=== Rice ===
Rice at Louisiana Tech

Team	1	2	3	4	Total
Owls	0	17	6	14	37
• Bulldogs	21	14	7	14	56

- Date: September 15
- Location: Joe Aillet Stadium
  Ruston, LA
- Game start: 6:05 p.m. CDT
- Elapsed time: 3:30
- Game attendance: 23,228
- Game weather: 75 °F (24 °C), overcast
- Referee: Clair Gausman
- TV announcers (ESPN3): Rich Hollenberg (play-by-play), Ralph Friedgen (color)

Scoring summary
1	12:58	LaTech	Quinton Patton 65-yard pass from Colby Cameron (Matt Nelson kick)	LaTech 7–0
1	5:58	LaTech	Hunter Lee 14-yard pass from Colby Cameron (Matt Nelson kick)	LaTech 14–0
1	3:48	LaTech	Myles White 16-yard pass from Colby Cameron (Matt Nelson kick)	LaTech 21–0
2	12:00	Rice	Charles Ross 18-yard pass from Taylor McHargue (Chris Boswell kick)	LaTech 21–7
2	9:17	LaTech	Kenneth Dixon 1-yard run (Matt Nelson kick)	LaTech 28–7
2	4:25	Rice	Taylor McHargue 3-yard run (Chris Boswell kick)	LaTech 28–14
2	2:55	LaTech	Kenneth Dixon 8-yard run (Matt Nelson kick)	LaTech 35–14
2	0:12	Rice	Chris Boswell 57-yard field goal	LaTech 35–17
3	11:56	LaTech	Quinton Patton 11-yard pass from Colby Cameron (Matt Nelson kick)	LaTech 42–17
3	4:58	Rice	Taylor McHargue 13-yard run (Chris Boswell kick failed)	LaTech 42–23
4	13:45	LaTech	Kenneth Dixon 9-yard run (Matt Nelson kick)	LaTech 49–23
4	8:22	Rice	Taylor McHargue 4-yard run (Chris Boswell kick)	LaTech 49–30
4	3:40	LaTech	Hunter Lee 6-yard run (Matt Nelson kick)	LaTech 56–30
4	1:32	Rice	Vance McDonald 14-yard pass from Taylor McHargue (Chris Boswell kick)	LaTech 56–37

Statistics	RICE	LT
First downs	33	30
Total yards	477	609
Rushing yards	272	333
Passing yards	205	276
Turnovers	2	1
Time of possession	34:57	25:03

Team	Category	Player	Statistics
Rice	Passing	Taylor McHargue	20/34, 205 yards, 2 TD
Rice	Rushing	Charles Ross	14 rushes, 116 yards
Rice	Receiving	Jordan Taylor	4 receptions, 57 yards
Louisiana Tech	Passing	Colby Cameron	19/24, 276 yards, 4 TD
Louisiana Tech	Rushing	Tevin King	22 rushes, 204 yards
Louisiana Tech	Receiving	Quinton Patton	7 receptions, 119 yards, 2 TD

Quarterback Colby Cameron was named WAC Offensive Player of the Week (Week 3) for his performance against Rice.

=== At Illinois ===
Louisiana Tech at Illinois

Team	1	2	3	4	Total
• Bulldogs	21	0	24	7	52
Fighting Illini	7	10	0	7	24

- Date: September 22
- Location: Memorial Stadium
  Champaign, IL
- Game start: 7:01 p.m. CDT
- Elapsed time: 3:09
- Game attendance: 46,539
- Game weather: 57 °F (14 °C), clear, winds N-NW 7 mph (11 km/h)
- Referee: Alex Kemp
- TV announcers (BTN): Chris Denari (play-by-play), Jeremy Leman (color), Tony Banks (sideline)

Scoring summary
1	8:30	ILL	Ryan Lankford 18-yard pass from Nathan Scheelhaase (Taylor Zalewski kick)	ILL 0–7
1	5:58	LaTech	D.J. Banks 27-yard pass from Colby Cameron (Matt Nelson kick)	TIED 7–7
1	4:37	LaTech	Tevin King 9-yard run (Matt Nelson kick)	LaTech 14–7
1	0:19	LaTech	Tevin King 5-yard run (Matt Nelson kick)	LaTech 21–7
2	12:14	ILL	Taylor Zalewski 26-yard field goal	LaTech 21–10
2	4:01	ILL	Donovonn Young 1-yard run (Taylor Zalewski kick)	LaTech 21–17
3	14:15	LaTech	Quinton Patton 78-yard pass from Colby Cameron (Matt Nelson kick)	LaTech 28–17
3	9:26	LaTech	Quinton Patton 21-yard pass from Colby Cameron (Matt Nelson kick)	LaTech 35–17
3	4:27	LaTech	Antonio Mitchum 0-yard fumble recovery (Matt Nelson kick)	LaTech 42–17
3	1:42	LaTech	Matt Nelson 32-yard field goal	LaTech 45–17
4	10:39	LaTech	Myles White 38-yard pass from Colby Cameron (Matt Nelson kick)	LaTech 52–17
4	5:20	ILL	Reilly O'Toole 1-yard run (Taylor Zalewski kick)	LaTech 52–24

Statistics	LT	ILL
First downs	17	20
Total yards	403	294
Rushing yards	119	89
Passing yards	284	205
Turnovers	3	6
Time of possession	25:33	46:52

Team	Category	Player	Statistics
Louisiana Tech	Passing	Colby Cameron	15/22, 284 yards, 4 TD
Louisiana Tech	Rushing	Tevin King	11 rushes, 53 yards, 2 TD
Louisiana Tech	Receiving	Quinton Patton	6 receptions, 164 yards, 2 TD
Illinois	Passing	Reilly O'Toole	19/25, 120 yards
Illinois	Rushing	Donovonn Young	19 rushes, 78 yards, TD
Illinois	Receiving	Josh Ferguson	10 receptions, 84 yards

Linebacker Antonio Mitchum was named WAC Defensive Player of the Week (Week 4) for his performance against Illinois. Wide receiver Quinton Patton was awarded an ESPN helmet sticker for his performance Week 4 against Illinois. Colby Cameron was named the Manning Star of the Week for his performance in Week 4.

=== At Virginia ===
Louisiana Tech at Virginia

Team	1	2	3	4	Total
• Bulldogs	10	10	21	3	44
Cavaliers	14	10	0	14	38

- Date: September 29
- Location: Scott Stadium
  Charlottesville, VA
- Game start: 3:34 p.m. EDT
- Elapsed time: 3:43
- Game attendance: 42,027
- Game weather: 69 °F (21 °C), partly cloudy, winds E 3 mph (4.8 km/h)
- Referee: J. Magallanes
- TV announcers (ESPN3): John Sadak (play-by-play), John Gregory (color), Angela Mallen (sideline)

Scoring summary
1	10:01	UVA	Tim Smith 36-yard pass from Perry Jones (Drew Jarrett kick)	UVA 0–7
1	8:13	LaTech	Matt Nelson 31-yard field goal	UVA 3–7
1	4:25	UVA	Paul Freedman 2-yard pass from Michael Rocco (Drew Jarrett kick)	UVA 3–14
1	1:54	LaTech	R.P. Stuart 3-yard pass from Colby Cameron (Matt Nelson kick)	UVA 10–14
2	14:14	UVA	Khalek Shepherd 73-yard pass from Michael Rocco (Drew Jarrett kick)	UVA 10–21
2	7:35	UVA	Drew Jarrett 35-yard field goal	UVA 10–24
2	3:02	LaTech	Ray Holley 16-yard run (Matt Nelson kick)	UVA 17–24
2	0:03	LaTech	Matt Nelson 40-yard field goal	UVA 20–24
3	11:20	LaTech	Ray Holley 11-yard run (Matt Nelson kick)	LaTech 27–24
3	6:00	LaTech	Colby Cameron 14-yard run (Matt Nelson kick)	LaTech 34–24
3	5:08	LaTech	Chip Hester 32-yard interception return (Matt Nelson kick)	LaTech 41–24
4	12:47	LaTech	Matt Nelson 45-yard field goal	LaTech 44–24
4	6:56	UVA	J McGee 3-yard pass from Phillip Sims (Drew Jarrett kick)	LaTech 44–31
4	2:08	UVA	Adrian Gamble 24-yard pass from Phillip Sims (Drew Jarrett kick)	LaTech 44–38

Statistics	LT	UVA
First downs	21	24
Total yards	385	625
Rushing yards	158	145
Passing yards	227	480
Turnovers	0	3
Time of possession	25:13	34:47

Team	Category	Player	Statistics
Louisiana Tech	Passing	Colby Cameron	24/37, 227 yards, TD
Louisiana Tech	Rushing	Kenneth Dixon	16 rushes, 78 yards
Louisiana Tech	Receiving	Quinton Patton	8 receptions, 97 yards
Virginia	Passing	Michael Rocco	14/23, 278 yards, 2 TD, 3 INT
Virginia	Rushing	Perry Jones	18 rushes, 82 yards
Virginia	Receiving	Darius Jennings	6 receptions, 136 yards

Placekicker Matt Nelson was named WAC Special Teams Player of the Week (Week 5) for his performance against Virginia.

=== UNLV ===
UNLV at Louisiana Tech

Team	1	2	3	4	Total
Rebels	7	10	7	7	31
• Bulldogs	20	7	17	14	58

- Date: October 6
- Location: Joe Aillet Stadium
  Ruston, LA
- Game start: 6:06 p.m. CDT
- Elapsed time: 3:36
- Game attendance: 21,850
- Game weather: 56 °F (13 °C), overcast, winds SW 5–10 mph (8.0–16.1 km/h)
- Referee: David Alvarez
- TV announcers (ERT): Trey Bender (play-by-play), Jay Taylor (color)

Scoring summary
1	12:35	LaTech	Matt Nelson 27-yard field goal	LaTech 3–0
1	9:42	UNLV	Taylor Barnhill 33-yard pass from Nick Sherry (Nolan Kohorst kick)	UNLV 3–7
1	6:07	LaTech	Matt Nelson 33-yard field goal	UNLV 6–7
1	2:48	LaTech	Quinton Patton 6-yard pass from Colby Cameron (Matt Nelson kick)	LaTech 13–7
1	1:40	LaTech	Ray Holley 9-yard run (Matt Nelson kick)	LaTech 20–7
2	8:25	LaTech	Kenneth Dixon 1-yard run (Matt Nelson kick)	LaTech 27–7
2	5:32	UNLV	Devante Davis 27-yard pass from Nick Sherry (Nolan Kohorst kick)	LaTech 27–14
2	0:44	UNLV	Nolan Kohorst 25-yard field goal	LaTech 27–17
3	12:25	UNLV	Marcus Sullivan 46-yard pass from Nick Sherry (Nolan Kohorst kick)	LaTech 27–24
3	10:42	LaTech	Kenneth Dixon 10-yard run (Matt Nelson kick)	LaTech 34–24
3	7:30	LaTech	Matt Nelson 43-yard field goal	LaTech 37–24
3	4:39	LaTech	Kenneth Dixon 15-yard run (Matt Nelson kick)	LaTech 44–24
4	12:07	LaTech	Kenneth Dixon 7-yard run (Matt Nelson kick)	LaTech 51–24
4	2:42	LaTech	Hunter Lee 17-yard run (Matt Nelson kick)	LaTech 58–24
4	1:33	UNLV	Anthony Williams 13-yard pass from Nick Sherry (Nolan Kohorst kick)	LaTech 58–31

Statistics	UNLV	LT
First downs	23	35
Total yards	536	622
Rushing yards	158	306
Passing yards	378	316
Turnovers	2	0
Time of possession	30:44	29:10

Team	Category	Player	Statistics
UNLV	Passing	Nick Sherry	22/46, 378 yards, 4 TD, INT
UNLV	Rushing	Tim Cornett	23 rushes, 111 yards
UNLV	Receiving	Devante Davis	8 receptions, 186 yards, TD
Louisiana Tech	Passing	Colby Cameron	31/45, 316 yards, TD
Louisiana Tech	Rushing	Ray Holley	22 rushes, 139 yards, TD
Louisiana Tech	Receiving	Quinton Patton	9 receptions, 116 yards, TD

Running back Kenneth Dixon was named WAC Offensive Player of the Week (Week 6) for his performance against UNLV.

=== Texas A&M ===
Texas A&M at Louisiana Tech

Team	1	2	3	4	Total
• No. 22 Aggies	21	18	7	13	59
No. 23 Bulldogs	0	16	14	27	57

- Date: October 13
- Location: Independence Stadium
  Shreveport, LA
- Game start: 8:17 p.m. CDT
- Elapsed time: 4:28
- Game attendance: 40,453
- Game weather: 77 °F (25 °C), mostly cloudy, winds N 18 mph (29 km/h)
- Referee: Penn Wagers
- TV announcers (ESPNU): Joe Davis (play-by-play), Kelly Stouffer (color), Cara Capuano (sideline)

Scoring summary
1	13:10	TAMU	Christine Michael 40-yard run (Taylor Bertolet kick)	TAMU 0–7
1	7:46	TAMU	LeKendrick Williams 20-yard pass from Johnny Manziel (Taylor Bertolet kick)	TAMU 0–14
1	2:17	TAMU	Johnny Manziel 15-yard run (Taylor Bertolet kick)	TAMU 0–21
2	12:40	TAMU	Taylor Bertolet 26-yard field goal	TAMU 0–24
2	8:21	TAMU	Taylor Bertolet 54-yard field goal	TAMU 0–27
2	5:32	LaTech	Quinton Patton 11-yard pass from Colby Cameron (Matt Nelson kick)	TAMU 7–27
2	5:20	TAMU	Mike Evans 75-yard pass from Johnny Manziel (Taylor Bertolet kick)	TAMU 7–34
2	2:55	LaTech	Kenneth Dixon 6-yard run (Matt Nelson PAT blocked)	TAMU 13–34
2	2:55	TAMU	Dustin Harris PAT return	TAMU 13–36
2	0:45	TAMU	Taylor Bertolet 28-yard field goal	TAMU 13–39
2	0:00	LaTech	Matt Nelson 43-yard field goal	TAMU 16–39
3	9:17	LaTech	Quinton Patton 2-yard pass from Colby Cameron (Matt Nelson kick)	TAMU 23–39
3	5:44	TAMU	Johnny Manziel 2-yard run (Taylor Bertolet kick)	TAMU 23–46
3	2:53	LaTech	Quinton Patton 5-yard pass from Colby Cameron (Matt Nelson kick)	TAMU 30–46
4	12:29	LaTech	Kenneth Dixon 22-yard run (Colby Cameron run for 2-point conversion)	TAMU 38–46
4	11:59	LaTech	Shakeil Lucas 5-yard interception return (pass for 2-point conversion failed)	TAMU 44–46
4	7:28	TAMU	Thomas Johnson 17-yard pass from Johnny Manziel (Taylor Bertolet kick)	TAMU 44–53
4	2:04	TAMU	Johnny Manziel 72-yard run (PAT failed)	TAMU 44–59
4	1:46	LaTech	Quinton Patton 62-yard pass from Colby Cameron (Matt Nelson kick)	TAMU 51–59
4	0:38	LaTech	Ray Holley 13-yard pass from Colby Cameron (pass for 2-point conversion failed)	TAMU 57–59

Statistics	TAMU	LT
First downs	27	37
Total yards	678	615
Rushing yards	283	165
Passing yards	395	450
Turnovers	2	0
Time of possession	32:13	27:47

Team	Category	Player	Statistics
Texas A&M	Passing	Johnny Manziel	24/40, 395 yards, 3 TD, INT
Texas A&M	Rushing	Johnny Manziel	19 rushes, 181 yards, 3 TD
Texas A&M	Receiving	Mike Evans	4 receptions, 137 yards, TD
Louisiana Tech	Passing	Colby Cameron	44/58, 450 yards, 5 TD
Louisiana Tech	Rushing	Kenneth Dixon	19 rushes, 111 yards, 2 TD
Louisiana Tech	Receiving	Quinton Patton	21 receptions, 233 yards, 4 TD

This game was originally scheduled for August 30 at Independence Stadium in Shreveport, Louisiana. However, the game was postponed until October 13 due to Hurricane Isaac.

Wide receiver Quinton Patton was named WAC Offensive Player of the Week (Week 7) for his performance against Texas A&M. Colby Cameron was nominated for the Manning Star of the Week for his performance in Week 7.

=== Idaho ===
Idaho at Louisiana Tech

Team	1	2	3	4	Total
Vandals	14	7	0	7	28
• Bulldogs	35	21	14	0	70

- Date: October 20
- Location: Joe Aillet Stadium
  Ruston, LA
- Game start: 6:05 p.m. CDT
- Elapsed time: 3:19
- Game attendance: 20,255
- Game weather: 75 °F (24 °C), clear
- Referee: Jim Farmer
- TV announcers (ERT): Trey Bender (play-by-play), Jay Taylor (color)

Scoring summary
1	14:48	LaTech	Kenneth Dixon 1-yard run (Matt Nelson kick)	LaTech 7–0
1	12:56	LaTech	Kenneth Dixon 2-yard run (Matt Nelson kick)	LaTech 14–0
1	12:17	Idaho	Najee Lovett 58-yard pass from Roman Runner (Trey Farquhar kick)	LaTech 14–7
1	10:03	LaTech	Ray Holley 5-yard run (Matt Nelson kick)	LaTech 21–7
1	9:50	Idaho	Todd Handley 92-yard kickoff return (Trey Farquhar kick)	LaTech 21–14
1	7:58	LaTech	Kenneth Dixon 1-yard run (Matt Nelson kick)	LaTech 28–14
1	0:49	LaTech	Quinton Patton 20-yard pass from Colby Cameron (Matt Nelson kick)	LaTech 35–14
2	13:01	LaTech	Myles White 36-yard pass from Colby Cameron (Matt Nelson kick)	LaTech 42–14
2	9:50	LaTech	Kenneth Dixon 7-yard run (Matt Nelson kick)	LaTech 49–14
2	4:08	Idaho	James Baker 1-yard run (Trey Farquhar kick)	LaTech 49–21
2	3:17	LaTech	Kenneth Dixon 2-yard run (Matt Nelson kick)	LaTech 56–21
3	7:28	LaTech	Kenneth Dixon 20-yard run (Matt Nelson kick)	LaTech 63–21
3	4:02	LaTech	Zach Griffith 3-yard run (Matt Nelson kick)	LaTech 70–21
4	8:31	Idaho	Michael LaGrone 1-yard pass from Dominique Blackman (Trey Farquhar kick)	LaTech 70–28

Statistics	IDHO	LT
First downs	11	39
Total yards	304	839
Rushing yards	47	408
Passing yards	257	431
Turnovers	4	3
Time of possession	25:16	34:25

Team	Category	Player	Statistics
Idaho	Passing	Dominique Blackmon	20/35, 199 yards, TD, 2 INT
Idaho	Rushing	James Baker	10 rushes, 42 yards, TD
Idaho	Receiving	Najee Lovett	4 receptions, 78 yards, TD
Louisiana Tech	Passing	Colby Cameron	29/37, 400 yards, 2 TD
Louisiana Tech	Rushing	Kenneth Dixon	17 rushes, 232 yards, 6 TD
Louisiana Tech	Receiving	Myles White	6 receptions, 100 yards, TD

Running back Kenneth Dixon was named the WAC Offensive Player of the Week (Week 8) for his performance against Idaho.

=== At New Mexico State ===
Louisiana Tech at New Mexico State

Team	1	2	3	4	Total
• No. 24 Bulldogs	7	0	14	7	28
Aggies	0	0	0	14	14

- Date: October 27
- Location: Aggie Memorial Stadium
  Las Cruces, NM
- Game start: 6:00 p.m. MDT
- Elapsed time: 3:15
- Game attendance: 12,118
- Game weather: 62 °F (17 °C), sunny, winds SE 2 mph (3.2 km/h)
- Referee: Robert Cameron
- TV announcers (CSN Houston/ESPN3): Jeff Matthews (play-by-play), Danny Knee (color)

Scoring summary
1	6:10	LaTech	Kenneth Dixon 2-yard run (Matt Nelson kick)	LaTech 7–0
3	9:13	LaTech	Myles White 44-yard pass from Colby Cameron (Matt Nelson kick)	LaTech 14–0
3	4:34	LaTech	Colby Cameron 2-yard run (Matt Nelson kick)	LaTech 21–0
4	8:50	LaTech	Ray Holley 83-yard run (Matt Nelson kick)	LaTech 28–0
4	6:35	NMSU	Kemonte Bateman 19-yard pass from Andrew Manley (Marcus Johnson kick)	LaTech 28–7
4	2:06	NMSU	Austin Franklin 67-yard pass from Andrew Manley (Marcus Johnson kick)	LaTech 28–14

Statistics	LT	NMSU
First downs	26	20
Total yards	530	405
Rushing yards	238	122
Passing yards	292	283
Turnovers	0	3
Time of possession	29:19	30:02

Team	Category	Player	Statistics
Louisiana Tech	Passing	Colby Cameron	29/44, 292 yards, TD
Louisiana Tech	Rushing	Ray Holley	12 rushes, 130 yards, TD
Louisiana Tech	Receiving	Myles White	7 receptions, 125 yards, TD
New Mexico State	Passing	Andrew Manley	18/34, 283 yards, 2 TD, INT
New Mexico State	Rushing	Germi Morrison	16 rushes, 92 yards
New Mexico State	Receiving	Austin Franklin	7 receptions, 139 yards, TD

Punter Ryan Allen was named WAC Special Teams Player of the Week (Week 9) for his performance against New Mexico State.

=== UTSA ===
UTSA at Louisiana Tech

Team	1	2	3	4	Total
Roadrunners	14	0	7	6	27
• No. 22 Bulldogs	14	13	7	17	51

- Date: November 3
- Location: Joe Aillet Stadium
  Ruston, LA
- Game start: 3:05 p.m. CDT
- Elapsed time: 3:20
- Game attendance: 23,645
- Game weather: 81 °F (27 °C), clear, winds NE 5 mph (8.0 km/h)
- Referee: Stacy Hardin
- TV announcers (ERT): Trey Bender (play-by-play), Jay Taylor (color)

Scoring summary
1	13:25	LaTech	R.P. Stuart 1-yard pass from Colby Cameron (Matt Nelson kick)	LaTech 7–0
1	10:26	UTSA	Cole Hubble 33-yard pass from Eric Soza (Kristian Stern kick)	Tied 7–7
1	9:38	LaTech	Kenneth Dixon 3-yard run (Matt Nelson kick)	LaTech 14–7
1	5:44	UTSA	Cole Hubble 57-yard pass from Eric Soza (Kristian Stern kick)	Tied 14–14
2	9:56	LaTech	Quinton Patton 79-yard pass from Colby Cameron (Matt Nelson Kick)	LaTech 21–14
2	0:08	LaTech	Jon Greenwalt 23-yard pass from Colby Cameron (PAT failed)	LaTech 27–14
3	10:52	UTSA	Earon Holmes 17-yard pass from Eric Soza (Kristian Stern kick)	LaTech 27–21
3	7:01	LaTech	Kenneth Dixon 7-yard run (Matt Nelson kick)	LaTech 34–21
4	14:27	LaTech	Matt Nelson 22-yard field goal	LaTech 37–21
4	11:50	UTSA	Cole Hicks 14-yard pass from Eric Soza (2-point conversion failed)	LaTech 37–27
4	7:33	LaTech	Malon Lee 9-yard pass from David Gru (Matt Nelson kick)	LaTech 44–27
4	0:14	LaTech	Kenneth Dixon 6-yard run (Matt Nelson kick)	LaTech 51–27

Statistics	UTSA	LT
First downs	25	33
Total yards	438	537
Rushing yards	124	180
Passing yards	314	357
Turnovers	0	0
Time of possession	34:00	26:00

Team	Category	Player	Statistics
UTSA	Passing	Eric Soza	23/41, 314 yards, 4 TD
UTSA	Rushing	David Glasco II	13 rushes, 63 yards
UTSA	Receiving	Cole Hubble	3 receptions, 101 yards, TD
Louisiana Tech	Passing	Colby Cameron	30/39, 348 yards, 3 TD
Louisiana Tech	Rushing	Kenneth Dixon	18 rushes, 72 yards, 3 TD
Louisiana Tech	Receiving	Quinton Patton	10 receptions, 152 yards, TD

Punter Ryan Allen was named WAC Special Teams Player of the Week (Week 10) for his performance against UTSA. Colby Cameron was nominated for the Manning Star of the Week for his performance in Week 10.

=== At Texas State ===
Louisiana Tech at Texas State

Team	1	2	3	4	Total
• No. 19 Bulldogs	14	27	7	14	62
Bobcats	14	20	7	14	55

- Date: November 10
- Location: Bobcat Stadium
  San Marcos, TX
- Game start: 6:06 p.m. CST
- Elapsed time: 4:03
- Game attendance: 17,184
- Game weather: 76 °F (24 °C), partly cloudy, winds SSE 21 mph (34 km/h)
- Referee: Clair Gausman
- TV announcers (LHN): Dave Armstrong (play-by-play), Ray Bentley (color)

Scoring summary
1	12:07	TXST	Terrence Franks 11-yard run (Will Johnson kick)	TXST 0–7
1	8:21	LaTech	R.P. Stuart 4-yard pass from Colby Cameron (Matt Nelson kick)	Tied 7–7
1	6:27	TXST	Marcus Curry 55-yard run (Will Johnson kick)	TXST 7–14
1	1:10	LaTech	Kenneth Dixon 14-yard pass from Colby Cameron (Matt Nelson kick)	Tied 14–14
2	13:51	TXST	Bradley Miller 19-yard pass from Shaun Rutherford (Will Johnson kick)	TXST 14–21
2	11:04	LaTech	Kenneth Dixon 4-yard run (Matt Nelson kick)	Tied 21–21
2	7:19	LaTech	Kenneth Dixon 1-yard run (Matt Nelson kick)	LaTech 28–21
2	5:28	TXST	Marcus Curry 47-yard pass from Tim Hawkins (PAT blocked)	LaTech 28–27
2	2:38	LaTech	Kenneth Dixon 13-yard run (PAT failed)	LaTech 34–27
2	0:48	TXST	Marcus Curry 5-yard run (Will Johnson kick)	Tied 34–34
2	0:23	LaTech	D.J. Banks 49-yard pass from Colby Cameron (Matt Nelson kick)	LaTech 41–34
3	11:17	LaTech	Kenneth Dixon 16-yard run (Matt Nelson kick)	LaTech 48–34
3	3:11	TXST	Terrence Franks 22-yard run (Will Johnson kick)	LaTech 48–41
4	14:55	TXST	Bradley Miller 12-yard pass from Shaun Rutherford (Will Johnson kick)	Tied 48–48
4	12:51	LaTech	Ray Holley 6-yard run (Matt Nelson kick)	LaTech 55–48
4	3:23	LaTech	Colby Cameron 2-yard run (Matt Nelson kick)	LaTech 62–48
4	1:07	TXST	Shaun Rutherford 1-yard run (Will Johnson kick)	LaTech 62–55

Statistics	LT	TXST
First downs	38	31
Total yards	627	577
Rushing yards	283	296
Passing yards	344	281
Turnovers	0	0
Time of possession	31:29	27:53

Team	Category	Player	Statistics
Louisiana Tech	Passing	Colby Cameron	31/45, 337 yards, 3 TD
Louisiana Tech	Rushing	Ray Holley	27 rushes, 145 yards, TD
Louisiana Tech	Receiving	D. J. Banks	5 receptions, 96 yards, TD
Texas State	Passing	Shaun Rutherford	21/37, 234 yards, 2 TD
Texas State	Rushing	Marcus Curry	13 rushes, 134 yards, 2 TD
Texas State	Receiving	Bradley Miller	5 receptions, 65 yards, 2 TD

Running back Kenneth Dixon was named WAC Offensive Player of the Week (Week 11) for his performance against Texas State. Colby Cameron was nominated for the Manning Star of the Week for his performance in Week 11.

=== Utah State ===
Utah State at Louisiana Tech

Team	1	2	3	4	OT	Total
• Aggies	14	3	24	0	7	48
No. 19 Bulldogs	0	3	21	17	0	41

- Date: November 17
- Location: Joe Aillet Stadium
  Ruston, LA
- Game start: 3:04 p.m. CST
- Elapsed time: 3:42
- Game attendance: 25,614
- Game weather: 65 °F (18 °C), clear, calm
- Referee: Robert Cameron
- TV announcers (ESPN3): Trey Bender (play-by-play), John Bunting (color)

Scoring summary
1	13:57	USU	Kerwynn Williams 86-yard pass from Chuckie Keeton (Nick Diaz kick)	USU 0–7
1	0:58	USU	Kellen Bartlett 3-yard pass from Chuckie Keeton (Nick Diaz kick)	USU 0–14
2	12:19	LaTech	Matt Nelson 36-yard field goal	USU 3–14
2	3:55	USU	Nick Diaz 38-yard field goal	USU 3–17
3	13:24	USU	Chuckie Keeton 13-yard run (Nick Diaz kick)	USU 3–24
3	11:34	USU	Nick Diaz 30-yard field goal	USU 3–27
3	8:17	LaTech	Kenneth Dixon 2-yard run (Matt Nelson kick)	USU 10–27
3	5:20	USU	Chuckie Keeton 25-yard run (Nick Diaz kick)	USU 10–34
3	4:04	LaTech	Myles White 25-yard pass from Colby Cameron (Matt Nelson kick)	USU 17–34
3	1:00	USU	Kerwynn Williams 1-yard run (Nick Diaz kick)	USU 17–41
3	0:48	LaTech	D.J. Banks 98-yard kickoff return (Matt Nelson kick)	USU 24–41
4	10:54	LaTech	Kenneth Dixon 1-yard run (Matt Nelson kick)	USU 31–41
4	1:54	LaTech	Hunter Lee 7-yard run (Matt Nelson kick)	USU 38–41
4	0:00	LaTech	Matt Nelson 32-yard field goal	Tied 41–41
OT		USU	Kerwynn Williams 4-yard run (Nick Diaz kick)	USU 41–48

Statistics	USU	LT
First downs	27	37
Total yards	646	629
Rushing yards	306	233
Passing yards	340	396
Turnovers	0	3
Time of possession	31:33	28:15

Team	Category	Player	Statistics
Utah State	Passing	Chuckie Keeton	20/34, 340 yards, 2 TD
Utah State	Rushing	Kerwynn Williams	20 rushes, 162 yards, 2 TD
Utah State	Receiving	Kerwynn Williams	4 receptions, 125 yards, TD
Louisiana Tech	Passing	Colby Cameron	35/60, 396 yards, TD, 2 INT
Louisiana Tech	Rushing	Kenneth Dixon	22 rushes, 109 yards, 2 TD
Louisiana Tech	Receiving	Quinton Patton	11 receptions, 181 yards

Kick returner D. J. Banks was named WAC Special Teams Player of the Week (Week 12) for his performance against Utah State.

=== At San Jose State ===
Louisiana Tech at San Jose State

Team	1	2	3	4	Total
Bulldogs	6	21	10	6	43
• Spartans	10	14	14	14	52

- Date: November 24
- Location: Spartan Stadium
  San Jose, CA
- Game start: 7:41 p.m. PST
- Elapsed time: 3:39
- Game attendance: 12,326
- Game weather: 59 °F (15 °C), clear, winds W 1 mph (1.6 km/h)
- Referee: Stacy Hardin
- TV announcers (ESPN2): Joe Davis (play-by-play), Tom Luginbill (color)

Scoring summary
1	12:43	SJSU	Austin Lopez 45-yard field goal	SJSU 0–3
1	8:35	SJSU	Hansel Wilson 42-yard pass from David Fales (Austin Lopez kick)	SJSU 0–10
1	2:38	LaTech	Kenneth Dixon 8-yard run (PAT failed)	SJSU 6–10
2	13:22	SJSU	Ryan Otten 18-yard pass from David Fales (Austin Lopez kick)	SJSU 6–17
2	8:42	LaTech	Malon Lee 15-yard pass from David Gru (Matt Nelson kick)	SJSU 13–17
2	4:56	SJSU	De'Leon Eskridge 1-yard run (Austin Lopez kick)	SJSU 13–24
2	1:57	LaTech	Quinton Patton 52-yard pass from Colby Cameron (Matt Nelson kick)	SJSU 20–24
2	0:26	LaTech	Colby Cameron 1-yard run (Matt Nelson kick)	LaTech 27–24
3	11:50	LaTech	Matt Nelson 29-yard field goal	LaTech 30–24
3	8:16	SJSU	Ina Liaina 4-yard run (Austin Lopez kick)	SJSU 30–31
3	7:03	LaTech	Myles White 33-yard pass from Colby Cameron (Matt Nelson kick)	LaTech 37–31
3	5:52	SJSU	De'Leon Eskridge 32-yard run (Austin Lopez kick)	SJSU 37–38
4	13:50	SJSU	De'Leon Eskridge 1-yard run (Austin Lopez kick)	SJSU 37–45
4	11:37	LaTech	Quinton Patton 10-yard pass from Colby Cameron (2-point conversion failed)	SJSU 43–45
4	6:53	SJSU	Jabari Carr 26-yard pass from David Fales (Austin Lopez kick)	SJSU 43–52

Statistics	LT	SJSU
First downs	27	30
Total yards	541	610
Rushing yards	58	243
Passing yards	483	367
Turnovers	3	2
Time of possession	24:40	35:31

Team	Category	Player	Statistics
Louisiana Tech	Passing	Colby Cameron	38/59, 468 yards, 3 TD, 3 INT
Louisiana Tech	Rushing	Kenneth Dixon	8 rushes, 33 yards, TD
Louisiana Tech	Receiving	Myles White	7 receptions, 126 yards, TD
San Jose State	Passing	David Fales	25/37, 367 yards, 3 TD, INT
San Jose State	Rushing	De'Leon Eskridge	28 rushes, 217 yards, 3 TD
San Jose State	Receiving	Noel Grigsby	7 receptions, 127 yards

== Statistics ==
Louisiana Tech ranked 1st in the nation in scoring offense (51.5 points per game), total offense (577.92 yards per game), and net punting (43.51 yards per punt). Individually, Kenneth Dixon ranked led the nation in scoring average (14.0 points per game), and Ryan Allen led the nation in punting average (48.04 yards per punt).

== After the season ==
=== Bowl invitation controversy ===
On Friday, November 30, Louisiana Tech was invited to play in the Independence Bowl, but asked for more time as they were in negotiations with the Liberty Bowl and Heart of Dallas Bowl. Louisiana Tech athletic director Bruce Van De Velde and WAC commissioner Jeff Hurd claimed that on December 1, Liberty Bowl executive director Steve Ehrhart guaranteed the Bulldogs a bowl invite. The Independence Bowl offered Louisiana Tech again on Saturday, December 1. After receiving no response, bowl organizers invited the Ohio Bobcats instead. On December 2, the Liberty Bowl extended their remaining bid to Iowa State Cyclones instead of Louisiana Tech. As a result, Louisiana Tech did not play in any of the 2012–13 NCAA football bowl games. The school's administration blamed bowl officials for the situation, which attracted national attention and controversy.

=== Awards and honors ===
Two Bulldogs were honored with prestigious national awards. Ryan Allen won the 2012 Ray Guy Award honoring the nation's best punter to become the first student-athlete to win the award in consecutive years. Colby Cameron won the 2012 Sammy Baugh Trophy honoring the nation's top collegiate passer. Bulldogs were named semifinalists for three national awards including Colby Cameron for the Davey O'Brien Award, Quinton Patton for the Fred Biletnikoff Award, and Matt Nelson for the William V. Campbell Trophy.

For their individual performances during the regular season, several Bulldogs were named to various national All-America Teams. Ryan Allen was named to numerous All-America teams including the Associated Press (AP) All-America First Team, American Football Coaches Association (AFCA) All-America First Team, Football Writers Association of America (FWAA) All-America First Team, Sporting News (TSN) All-America First Team, Walter Camp All-America First Team (WCFF) All-America First Team, CBS Sports All-America First Team, ESPN All-America First Team, Pro Football Weekly (PFW) All-America First Team, and Sports Illustrated (SI) All-America First Team. The NCAA recognizes five All-America lists in the determination of unanimous All-America selections: the AP, AFCA, the FWAA, TSN and the WCFF. Unanimous selections must be selected as first team in all five lists. As such, for the 2012 season, Ryan Allen was named a unanimous All-American. Quinton Patton was named to several All-America teams including the AP All-America Second Team, CBS Sports All-America Second Team, SI All-America Second Team, and PFW All-America Honorable Mention Team. Colby Cameron was named to the SI All-America Honorable Mention Team. Kenneth Dixon was recognized with All-America honors including being named to the FWAA Freshman All-America First Team, CBS Sports Freshman All-America First Team, and College Football News (CFN) Freshman All-America First Team.

The WAC recognized a number of Bulldogs for their individual performances with various honors. Colby Cameron was named WAC Offensive Player of the Year, and Kenneth Dixon was named WAC Freshman of the Year. All-WAC First Team selections from Louisiana Tech included Ryan Allen, D.J. Banks, Colby Cameron, Dave Clark, Kenneth Dixon, I.K. Enemkpali, Jordan Mills, Quinton Patton, and Stephen Warner. All-WAC Second Team selections from Louisiana Tech included Chad Boyd, Ray Holley, Oscar Johnson, Kevin Saia, and Myles White.

The Louisiana Sports Writers Association (LSWA) decorated several Bulldogs with postseason honors. Colby Cameron was named LSWA Offensive Player of the Year, and Kenneth Dixon was named LSWA Louisiana Freshman of the Year. LSWA All-Louisiana First Team selections from Louisiana Tech included Ryan Allen, D.J. Banks, Colby Cameron, Kenneth Dixon, I.K. Enemkpali, Oscar Johnson, Quinton Patton, and Stephen Warner.

Several Louisiana Tech players were selected to participate in postseason all-star games. Three Bulldogs including Ryan Allen, Jordan Mills, and Quinton Patton accepted invitations to play in the 2013 Senior Bowl. Colby Cameron competed in the 2013 East–West Shrine Game. Ray Holley and Myles White played in the Casino del Sol College All-Star Game, and Holley's performance earned him the game's Offensive MVP award. Three Bulldogs including Kevin Saia, Stephen Warner, and Myles White participated in the NFLPA Collegiate Bowl. Jordan Mills was also invited to play in the Raycom College Football All-Star Classic.

In addition to their on-field accomplishments, many Bulldogs were recognized for their performance off the gridiron. Ray Holley and Stephen Warner were named to the Capital One Academic All-District First Team, and subsequently Ray Holley was honored even further by being named to the Capital One Academic All-America First Team. Academic All-WAC honorees include Josh Cuthbert, Ray Holley, Matt Nelson, Solomon Randle, Chandler Spence, Andre Taylor, and Stephen Warner. Chandler Spence was also honored with the 1A FAR Academic Excellence Award.

At the team banquet, several Bulldogs were honored with team awards. Colby Cameron was named the Terry Bradshaw Offensive Player of the Year, and I.K. Enemkpali was named the Fred Dean Defensive Player of the Year. Ryan Allen was recognized as the Matt Stover Special Teams Player of the Year. Stephen Warner was named the Willie Roaf Lineman of the Year, and Chad Boyd was given the Tramon Williams Defensive Back of the Year award. David Gru was honored with the Karl Malone Strength and Conditioning Award. Kendrick James and Rufus Porter were both honored with the Most Inspirational Award. Ray Holley was given the Dan Reneau Academic Award, and D.J. Banks was honored with the Davison Family Community Service Award.

A couple Louisiana Tech assistant coaches were nominated for national awards. Offensive coordinator Tony Franklin was nominated for the Broyles Award, an honor bestowed upon the nation's top assistant coach. Franklin was also one of four finalists for the FootballScoop Offensive Coordinator of the Year. Assistant coach Pierre Ingram was one of five finalists for the FootballScoop Running Backs Coach of the Year.

=== Coaching changes ===
On December 5, 2012, head coach Sonny Dykes was announced as the new head football coach at the University of California, Berkeley to replace recently fired Jeff Tedford. Offensive coordinator Tony Franklin, assistant head coach/outside receivers coach Rob Likens, special teams/inside receivers coach Mark Tommerdahl, running backs coach Pierre Ingram, and head strength and conditioning coach Damon Harrington were hired by Dykes at California. Cornerbacks coach Kevin Curtis was hired by Texas Tech. Offensive line coach Petey Perot was hired by Southern Miss. Defensive coordinator Tommy Spangler was hired by Presbyterian. On December 13, 2012, former South Florida head coach Skip Holtz accepted an offer to become the new head football coach at Louisiana Tech to replace Dykes. Holtz retained defensive line coach Stan Eggen and linebackers coach Jeff Koonz.

=== NFL draft ===
In February 2013, five Louisiana Tech Bulldogs were invited to the NFL Scouting Combine including Ryan Allen, Colby Cameron, Oscar Johnson, Jordan Mills, and Quinton Patton. At Louisiana Tech's Pro Day on March 26, twenty-four seniors worked out in front of scouts from twenty-three NFL teams. In April's 2013 NFL draft, Quinton Patton was selected by the San Francisco 49ers in the fourth round, and Jordan Mills was selected by the Chicago Bears in the fifth round. Following the draft, undrafted free agent signees from the 2013 squad were Ryan Allen (New England Patriots), Colby Cameron (Carolina Panthers), Myles White (Green Bay Packers), Ray Holley (Baltimore Ravens), Oscar Johnson (Tennessee Titans), and Kevin Saia (St. Louis Rams).

Rnd.	Pick	Team	Player	Pos.	College	Notes
4	128	San Francisco 49ers	Quinton Patton	WR	Louisiana Tech	
5	163	Chicago Bears	Jordan Mills	T	Louisiana Tech	
