= Huttig, Arkansas =

- City
- Location of Huttig in Union County, Arkansas.
- Coordinates: 33°02′30″N 92°10′54″W
- Country: United States
- State: Arkansas
- County: Union

Area
  - Total: 3.08 sq mi (7.98 km^{2})
  - Land: 2.98 sq mi (7.72 km^{2})
  - Water: 0.10 sq mi (0.26 km^{2})
- Elevation: 95 ft (29 m)

Population (2020)
  - Total: 448
  - Estimate (2025): 427 ▼
  - Density: 150.4/sq mi (58.06/km^{2})
- Time zone: UTC-6 (Central (CST))
  - Summer (DST): UTC-5 (CDT)
- ZIP code: 71747
- Area code: 870
- FIPS code: 05-34090
- GNIS feature ID: 2404751

Huttig is a city in Union County, Arkansas, United States. As of the 2020 census, Huttig had a population of 448.

== Geography ==
According to the United States Census Bureau, the city has a total area of 3.1 square miles (8.0 km^{2}), of which 3.0 square miles (7.8 km^{2}) is land and 0.1 square miles (0.26 km^{2}) (3.25%) is water.

== Demographics ==
Historical population
Census	Pop.	Note	%±
1910	1,240		—
1920	1,261		1.7%
1930	1,386		9.9%
1940	1,379		−0.5%
1950	1,038		−24.7%
1960	936		−9.8%
1970	822		−12.2%
1980	976		18.7%
1990	831		−14.9%
2000	731		−12.0%
2010	597		−18.3%
2020	448		−25.0%
2025 (est.)	427	▼	−4.7%
U.S. Decennial Census

=== 2020 census ===
Huttig city, Arkansas – Racial and ethnic composition Note: the US Census treats Hispanic/Latino as an ethnic category. This table excludes Latinos from the racial categories and assigns them to a separate category. Hispanics/Latinos may be of any race.
Race / Ethnicity (NH = Non-Hispanic)	Pop 2000	Pop 2010	Pop 2020	% 2000	% 2010	% 2020
White alone (NH)	353	267	149	48.29%	44.72%	33.26%
Black or African American alone (NH)	352	309	251	48.15%	51.76%	56.03%
Native American or Alaska Native alone (NH)	6	7	4	0.82%	1.17%	0.89%
Asian alone (NH)	0	0	0	0.00%	0.00%	0.00%
Native Hawaiian or Pacific Islander alone (NH)	1	0	2	0.14%	0.00%	0.45%
Other race alone (NH)	0	0	5	0.00%	0.00%	1.12%
Mixed race or Multiracial (NH)	8	7	24	1.09%	1.17%	5.36%
Hispanic or Latino (any race)	11	7	13	1.50%	1.17%	2.90%
Total	731	597	448	100.00%	100.00%	100.00%

=== 2000 census ===
As of the census of 2000, there were 731 people, 282 households, and 197 families residing in the city. The population density was 245.4 inhabitants per square mile (94.7/km^{2}). There were 321 housing units at an average density of 107.8 per square mile (41.6/km^{2}). The racial makeup of the city was 48.70% White, 48.43% Black or African American, 0.82% Native American, 0.14% Pacific Islander, 0.82% from other races, and 1.09% from two or more races. 1.50% of the population were Hispanic or Latino of any race.

There were 282 households, out of which 32.6% had children under the age of 18 living with them, 50.4% were married couples living together, 16.7% had a female householder with no husband present, and 29.8% were non-families. 28.0% of all households were made up of individuals, and 12.4% had someone living alone who was 65 years of age or older. The average household size was 2.59 and the average family size was 3.22.

In the city, the population was spread out, with 25.9% under the age of 18, 8.9% from 18 to 24, 29.4% from 25 to 44, 22.7% from 45 to 64, and 13.1% who were 65 years of age or older. The median age was 36 years. For every 100 females, there were 96.0 males. For every 100 females age 18 and over, there were 88.9 males.

The median income for a household in the city was $25,284, and the median income for a family was $32,000. Males had a median income of $31,375 versus $18,056 for females. The per capita income for the city was $12,215. About 16.1% of families and 16.2% of the population were below the poverty line, including 23.1% of those under age 18 and 11.3% of those age 65 or over.

== Education ==
Public education for elementary and secondary school students is provided by the Strong–Huttig School District, which leads to graduation from Strong High School.

It was served by Huttig School District, which operated Huttig Elementary School and Huttig High School. On July 1, 2004, it consolidated with the Strong School District to form the Strong-Huttig School District.

== Notable people ==
- Daisy Bates—civil rights activist
- Floyd Cramer—American Hall of Fame pianist
