= Kenneth Dixon (American football) =

American gridiron football player (born 1994)

No. 30
- Position: Running back

Personal information
- Born: January 21, 1994 (age 32); El Dorado, Arkansas, U.S.
- Listed height: 5 ft 10 in (1.78 m)
- Listed weight: 228 lb (103 kg)

Career information
- High school: Strong (Strong, Arkansas)
- College: Louisiana Tech (2012–2015)
- NFL draft: 2016: 4th round, 134th overall pick

Career history
- Baltimore Ravens (2016–2018); New York Jets (2019); Toronto Argonauts (2021)*
- * Offseason or practice squad member only

Awards and highlights
- NCAA rushing touchdowns leader (2012); NCAA scoring leader (2012); First-team All-Conference USA (2015); Second-team All-Conference USA (2013, 2014); Freshman All-American (2012); WAC Freshman of the Year (2012); First-team All-WAC (2012); NCAA (FBS) records: Freshman single-season rushing touchdowns: 27 (2012); Freshman single-season total touchdowns: 28 (2012); Longest rushing play: 99 yards (2014)

Career NFL statistics
- Games played: 18
- Rushing yards: 715
- Rushing average: 4.8
- Rushing touchdowns: 4
- Receptions: 36
- Receiving yards: 213
- Receiving touchdowns: 1
- Stats at Pro Football Reference

Kenneth Dixon (born January 21, 1994) is an American former professional football player who was a running back in the National Football League (NFL). He played college football for the Louisiana Tech Bulldogs, and was selected by the Baltimore Ravens in the fourth round of the 2016 NFL draft.

== Early life ==
Dixon attended Strong High School in Strong, Arkansas. During the team's state title run in Dixon's senior year 2011, he ran for a state record 3,153 yards and 39 touchdowns. For his season efforts, he was named "Mr. Football" in the state of Arkansas.

Dixon also competed in track & field at Strong. At the 2011 7AA District T&F Meet, Dixon threw the shot put over 49 feet (15 meters), won the 110-meter hurdles and the long jump, and also placed 2nd in the 100-meter dash. He also was an outstanding basketball player, leading his team to the district championship as a junior.

Regarded as a three-star recruit by Rivals.com, Dixon was considered the eighth best player in the state of Arkansas. He committed to Louisiana Tech University to play college football on January 6, 2012, choosing the Bulldogs over Arkansas State, Arkansas, LSU, and Ole Miss.

== College career ==
As a true freshman at Louisiana Tech in 2012, Dixon ran for 1,194 yards on 200 carries and set an NCAA freshman record with 27 rushing touchdowns and 28 total touchdowns. As a sophomore, Dixon played in 10 games, rushing for 917 yards on 151 carries with four touchdowns. During his junior year in 2014, Dixon became Louisiana Tech's all-time leader in rushing yards, rushing touchdowns and total touchdowns. For the season he had 1,299 rushing yards on 253 carries with 22 rushing touchdowns and six receiving touchdowns. As a senior, he rushed for 1,070 yards on 197 carries and 19 touchdowns. He finished his career with an NCAA record 87 career total touchdowns, however the record was later broken that same season by Keenan Reynolds.

=== Statistics ===
Legend
	Led the NCAA
**Bold**	Career high

Year	Team	Rushing					Receiving		
Year	Team	Att	Yds	Avg	Lng	TD	Rec	Yds	TD
2012	Louisiana Tech	200	1,194	6.0	48	**27**	10	35	1
2013	Louisiana Tech	151	917	**6.1**	72	4	14	85	1
2014	Louisiana Tech	**253**	**1,299**	5.1	**99**	22	30	385	6
2015	Louisiana Tech	198	1,073	5.4	65	19	**33**	**464**	**7**
**Career**		**802**	**4,483**	**5.6**	**99**	**72**	**87**	**969**	**15**

== Professional career ==
Pre-draft measurables
Height	Weight	Arm length	Hand span	40-yard dash	20-yard shuttle	Three-cone drill	Vertical jump	Broad jump	Bench press
5 ft 10 1/8 in (1.78 m)	215 lb (98 kg)	31 3/8 in (0.80 m)	9 1/2 in (0.24 m)	4.58 s	4.28 s	6.97 s	37.5 in (0.95 m)	10 ft 1 in (3.07 m)	18 reps
All values from NFL Combine

=== Baltimore Ravens ===
Dixon was drafted by the Ravens in the fourth round, 134th overall, in the 2016 NFL draft. He played in 12 games as the Ravens' second running back behind Terrance West. He ran for 382 yards and two touchdowns to go along with 30 catches for 162 yards and a touchdown.

On March 9, 2017, Dixon was suspended the first four games of the 2017 season for violating the league's policy on performance-enhancing drugs. On July 25, it was revealed that Dixon had suffered a torn meniscus in his left knee. The injury required surgery, and 4–5 months to recover, forcing Dixon out for the 2017 season. He was placed on injured reserve on September 1.

On September 12, 2018, Dixon was placed on injured reserve after suffering a knee injury in Week 1. He was activated off injured reserve on December 1. Overall, he finished the 2018 season with 333 rushing yards and two rushing touchdowns.

Dixon was placed on injured reserve on August 31, 2019, after suffering a fractured knee. He was waived from injured reserve with an injury settlement on September 6.

=== New York Jets ===
On December 18, 2019, Dixon was signed by the New York Jets. He was waived by the Jets on August 19, 2020.

=== Toronto Argonauts ===
Dixon signed with the Toronto Argonauts of the Canadian Football League on December 29, 2020. He was released by the Argonauts on July 27, 2021.

== See also ==
- List of NCAA major college football yearly rushing leaders
- List of NCAA major college football yearly scoring leaders
- List of NCAA Division I FBS players with at least 50 career rushing touchdowns
