= Strong–Huttig School District =

School district in Strong, Arkansas, US

Address
- 108 East 5th Street Strong, Arkansas, 71765; United States

District information
- Type: Public
- Grades: PreK–12
- NCES District ID: 0512930

Students and staff
- Students: 303
- Teachers: 29.83
- Staff: 31.14
- Student–teacher ratio: 10.16

Other information
- Website: www.strong.k12.ar.us

Strong–Huttig School District No. 83 is a public school district in Strong, Arkansas. The school district supports more than 350 students and employs more than 50 education and staff.

The school district encompasses 293.33 square miles (759.7 km^{2}) of land in Union County supporting Strong, Huttig, Felsenthal and all the rural area between Moro Bay and the state line.

== History ==
The district begin in 1903. On July 1, 2004, the Strong School District consolidated with the Huttig School District to form the Strong–Huttig School District.

Ordinarily a school district with fewer than 350 students for two consecutive years would be required to consolidate. In 2016 the Arkansas Board of Education granted a waiver that allowed Strong–Huttig to continue operating.

== Schools ==
- Gardner–Strong Elementary School, serving prekindergarten through grade 6.
- Strong High School, serving grades 7 through 12. Strong athletics are basketball, football, cheerleading, and (girls) softball.
