= Strong, Arkansas =

- City
- Location of Strong in Union County, Arkansas.
- Coordinates: 33°06′28″N 92°21′20″W
- Country: United States
- State: Arkansas
- County: Union

Area
  - Total: 1.60 sq mi (4.14 km^{2})
  - Land: 1.60 sq mi (4.14 km^{2})
  - Water: 0 sq mi (0.00 km^{2})
- Elevation: 118 ft (36 m)

Population (2020)
  - Total: 410
  - Estimate (2025): 400 ▼
  - Density: 256.7/sq mi (99.12/km^{2})
- Time zone: UTC-6 (Central (CST))
  - Summer (DST): UTC-5 (CDT)
- ZIP code: 71765
- Area code: 870
- FIPS code: 05-67370
- GNIS feature ID: 2405534

Strong is a city in Union County, Arkansas, United States. As of the 2020 census, Strong had a population of 410. According to the United States Census Bureau, the city has a total area of 1.1 square miles (2.8 km^{2}), all land. The community of New London was absorbed into Strong in the early 20th century.

== Education ==
Strong is the home of the Strong–Huttig School District, which includes Gardner–Strong Elementary School and Strong High School.

On July 1, 2004, the Strong School District consolidated with the Huttig School District to form the Strong-Huttig School District.

== Demographics ==
Historical population
Census	Pop.	Note	%±
1910	465		—
1920	507		9.0%
1930	740		46.0%
1940	762		3.0%
1950	839		10.1%
1960	741		−11.7%
1970	965		30.2%
1980	785		−18.7%
1990	624		−20.5%
2000	651		4.3%
2010	558		−14.3%
2020	410		−26.5%
2025 (est.)	400	▼	−2.4%
U.S. Decennial Census

=== 2020 Census ===
Strong, Arkansas – Racial and ethnic composition Note: the US Census treats Hispanic/Latino as an ethnic category. This table excludes Latinos from the racial categories and assigns them to a separate category. Hispanics/Latinos may be of any race.
Race / Ethnicity (NH = Non-Hispanic)	Pop 2000	Pop 2010	Pop 2020	% 2000	% 2010	% 2020
White alone (NH)	261	161	117	40.09%	28.85%	28.54%
Black or African American alone (NH)	346	339	270	53.15%	60.75%	65.85%
Native American or Alaska Native alone (NH)	1	1	1	0.15%	0.18%	0.24%
Asian alone (NH)	1	1	0	0.15%	0.18%	0.00%
Pacific Islander alone (NH)	0	0	0	0.00%	0.00%	0.00%
Some Other Race alone (NH)	0	0	0	0.00%	0.00%	0.00%
Mixed Race or Multi-Racial (NH)	5	10	12	0.77%	1.79%	2.93%
Hispanic or Latino (any race)	37	46	10	5.68%	8.24%	2.44%
Total	651	558	410	100.00%	100.00%	100.00%

=== 2000 census ===
As of the census of 2000, there were 651 people, 256 households, and 171 families residing in the city. The population density was 581.3 inhabitants per square mile (224.4/km^{2}). There were 285 housing units at an average density of 254.5 per square mile (98.3/km^{2}). The racial makeup of the city was 42.24% White, 53.61% Black or African American, 0.15% Native American, 0.15% Asian, 3.07% from other races, and 0.77% from two or more races. 5.68% of the population were Hispanic or Latino of any race.

There were 256 households, out of which 29.3% had children under the age of 18 living with them, 37.5% were married couples living together, 23.8% had a female householder with no husband present, and 33.2% were non-families. 30.5% of all households were made up of individuals, and 14.1% had someone living alone who was 65 years of age or older. The average household size was 2.54 and the average family size was 3.19.

In the city, the population was spread out, with 29.8% under the age of 18, 10.0% from 18 to 24, 22.6% from 25 to 44, 20.3% from 45 to 64, and 17.4% who were 65 years of age or older. The median age was 36 years. For every 100 females, there were 77.9 males. For every 100 females age 18 and over, there were 75.1 males. The median income for a household in the city was $21,389, and the median income for a family was $26,023. Males had a median income of $25,750 versus $20,417 for females. The per capita income for the city was $10,802. About 24.3% of families and 32.3% of the population were below the poverty line, including 47.5% of those under age 18 and 22.6% of those age 65 or over.
