= Strong High School =

Location
- 635 South Concord Street; Strong, Arkansas 71765; United States
- Coordinates: 33°6′22″N 92°21′20″W

Information
- School type: Public comprehensive
- Status: Open
- School district: Strong–Huttig School District (2004-); Strong School District (-2004)
- Superintendent: Jeff Alpin
- CEEB code: 042360
- NCES School ID: 051293001049
- Teaching staff: 32.99 (on FTE basis)
- Grades: 7–12
- Enrollment: 309 (2023–2024)
- Student to teacher ratio: 9.37
- Education system: ADE Smart Core
- Classes offered: Regular, Advanced Placement (AP)
- Colors: Royal blue and white
- Athletics conference: 2A 8 (Football); 2A 7 West (Basketball)
- Mascot: Bulldog
- Team name: Strong Bulldogs
- Accreditation: ADE
- Communities served: Strong, Huttig, Urbana, Lapile, Felsinthaw, New London, Gardner
- Federal Funding: Title I
- Website: strong.k12.ar.us

Strong High School (SHS) is a comprehensive public high school based in the town of Strong, Arkansas, United States. SHS provides secondary education for more than 200 students in grades 7 through 12. Strong is one of public high schools in Union County and is the sole high school of the Strong–Huttig School District.

== History ==
It was formerly in the Strong School District. On July 1, 2004, the Strong School District consolidated with the Huttig School District to form the Strong-Huttig School District.

== Academics ==
The assumed course of study follows the Smart Core curriculum developed by the ADE, which requires students complete at least 22 units prior to graduation. Students complete regular (core and elective) and career focus courses and exams and may take Advanced Placement (AP) courses and exam with the opportunity to receive college credit. Strong High School receives Title I federal funding.

Strong High School is accredited by the Arkansas Department of Education (ADE) and accredited by AdvancED since 1990.

== Extracurricular activities ==
The Strong High School mascot and athletic emblem is the Bulldog with royal blue and white serving as the school colors.

=== Athletics ===
The Strong Bulldogs compete in interscholastic activities within the 2A Classification from the 2A Region 8 Conference for football and 2A Region 7 West Conference as basketball, as administered by the Arkansas Activities Association. The Bulldogs field teams in football, basketball (boys/girls), fastpitch softball, Track & Field (boys/girls) and cheer.

- Football: The Bulldogs football team won the 2A classification state football championship in 2011. The football team moved to 8-man play in 2020 and won a State Championship their first season.
- Girls' Basketball: The Lady Bulldog basketball team has won 2 state titles. in 2005 and 2006.

== Notable alumni ==
- Floyd Cramer (1951, Huttig High School)—American Hall of Fame pianist.
- Kenneth Dixon (2012) is an American football running back for the Baltimore Ravens of the National Football League (NFL). He played college football at Louisiana Tech.
