= Strong School District =

Defunct school district in Arkansas, United States

Strong School District was a school district headquartered in Strong, Arkansas.

It operated Strong Elementary School and Strong High School.

On July 1, 2004, it consolidated with the Huttig School District to form the Strong-Huttig School District.
