= Grace Community School (Texas) =

Location
- Lower Campus: 3215 Old Jacksonville Rd.; Upper Campus: 3001 University Blvd. Tyler, Texas 75701

Information
- School type: Private
- Motto: Teaching Jesus
- Founded: 1973
- Principal: Grace University: Karla Flournoy; high school: Lanny Witt; middle school (5th & 6th grades): Karla Flournoy; middle school (7th & 8th grades): Joshua Webb; elementary: Jennifer Dozier
- Head of school: Jay Ferguson
- Grades: K4–12
- Enrollment: 998 (March 25, 2020)
- Colors: Blue, white & black
- Sports: Football, volleyball, basketball, soccer, swimming, track, golf, baseball, softball, cross country, tennis
- Mascot: Cougar
- Website: https://gracetyler.org/

Grace Community School is a private Christian school in Tyler, Texas, United States. It is a college preparatory school with selective admissions.

== History ==
The school was founded by Grace Community Church in 1973 and began with an enrollment of 60 students in grades 2-12. With the completion of the high school building in 1996, Grace expanded to two locations, keeping the elementary on Old Jacksonville Road and moving the junior high and high school to University Boulevard. Today the school exists as a junior kindergarten through 12th grade, coeducational, college-preparatory day school with selective admissions.

In 2017-2018, Grace Community Elementary School was awarded the National Blue Ribbon School status by the U.S. Department of Education. In 2015-2016, it was one of three high schools in Texas that were awarded the National Blue Ribbon School status by the U.S. Department of Education (0.5% of U.S. schools earn this coveted distinction).

== Mission ==
Grace Community School's mission is to assist Christian families in educating, equipping, and encouraging their children to influence the world for Christ.

== Accreditation and associations ==
Grace Community School is an Exemplary Accredited School by the Association of Christian Schools International (ACSI). The school was awarded exemplary accreditation in its inaugural year.

Grace is a member of the Council on Educational Standards and Accountability (CESA) which serves Christian schools and Christian organizations through leadership services, academic enrichment, programmatic development, and professional development; and by providing fellowship and fraternity to those who serve within Christian institutions.

The Texas Association of Private and Parochial Schools (TAPPS) states as its mission the building of leadership, fellowship, fair play, and sportsmanship of students enrolled in the organization's member schools in the areas of academics, athletics, and fine arts by providing wholesome competition for young men and women. Grace Community School is a top competitor among TAPPS associated schools.

== Achievements and awards ==
Grace Community School won the 2017 Henderson Cup, the overall state championship award given by the Texas Association of Private and Parochial Schools. This annual award is presented to the school that earns the most points in 27 TAPPS competitions in a given school year. TAPPS competitions include three areas: academics, fine arts, and athletics. Grace is the first school in East Texas to win the Henderson Cup in the 5A classification.
