= Jay Taylor (defensive back) =

American football player (born 1967)

No. 27
- Position: Cornerback

Personal information
- Born: November 8, 1967 (age 58); San Diego, California, U.S.
- Listed height: 5 ft 10 in (1.78 m)
- Listed weight: 170 lb (77 kg)

Career information
- High school: St. Augustine (San Diego)
- College: San Jose State
- NFL draft: 1989: 6th round, 150th overall pick

Career history
- Phoenix Cardinals (1989–1992); Kansas City Chiefs (1993–1995); Tampa Bay Buccaneers (1996)*
- * Offseason or practice squad member only

Career NFL statistics
- Games played – started: 79 – 24
- Tackles: 93
- Interceptions: 5
- Stats at Pro Football Reference

Emanuel Jay Taylor (born November 8, 1967) is an American former professional football player who was a cornerback for in the National Football League (NFL). He spent seven seasons with the Phoenix Cardinals and Kansas City Chiefs. He played college football for the San Jose State Spartans and was selected 150th overall by the Cardinals in the sixth round of the 1989 NFL draft.
