= Ray Holley =

American gridiron football player (born 1990)

No. 25
- Position: Running back

Personal information
- Born: June 14, 1990 (age 36); Orange, California, U.S.
- Listed height: 5 ft 9 in (1.75 m)
- Listed weight: 200 lb (91 kg)

Career information
- High school: El Modena High School
- College: Louisiana Tech

Career history
- 2013: Baltimore Ravens*
- 2013: Seattle Seahawks*
- 2015: Hamilton Tiger-Cats
- * Offseason or practice squad member only

Awards and highlights
- Second-team All-WAC (2012)
- Stats at CFL.ca

Ray Holley (born June 14, 1990) is an American former professional football running back who played for the Hamilton Tiger-Cats of the Canadian Football League (CFL). He attended Louisiana Tech University, where he played college football for the Louisiana Tech Bulldogs.

== Early career ==
Holley played high school football at El Modena High School before attending Orange Coast College for two years. In 2009, he recorded 311 carries for a school-best 1,457 rushing yards. He transferred to Louisiana Tech to play for the Bulldogs in 2010, where he played until 2012. Holley missed games during 2011 due to a season-ending back injury. In his final year with the Bulldogs, he ran for 1,090 yards and 13 touchdowns.

== Professional career ==
Holley was eligible for the 2013 NFL draft and participated in Louisiana Tech's Pro Day that year. Holley initially drew interest from multiple teams, including tryouts from the New England Patriots and the Dallas Cowboys, but went undrafted. He was eventually signed by the Baltimore Ravens as a free agent shortly after the draft. He was later released and joined the Seattle Seahawks for a short period of time prior to the start of the regular season.

Holley worked part-time installing air conditioners until April 2015, but attended the Hamilton Tiger-Cats free agent camp that month. He signed with the Tiger-Cats in late May. Due to injuries to Mossis Madu and C. J. Gable, Holley became the starting running back for the Tiger-Cats in June. He made his CFL debut starting in the season opener against the Calgary Stampeders on June 26, 2015, where he rushed for 24 yards on 8 carries.
