= Huttig School District =

Defunct school district in Arkansas, United States

Huttig School District #60 was a school district headquartered in Huttig, Arkansas.

It operated Huttig Elementary School and Huttig High School. Circa 2004 it had 240 students.

By 2004 new laws were passed requiring school districts with enrollments below 350 to consolidate with other school districts. Huttig was one of several districts that were unable to find another district willing to consolidate with it, so the Arkansas Board of Education was to forcibly consolidate it. On July 1, 2004, it consolidated with the Strong School District to form the Strong-Huttig School District.
