= List of NCAA Division I-AA/FCS football seasons =

A list of NCAA Division I-AA college football seasons since the divisional split in 1978. In 2006, Division I-AA was renamed Division I Football Championship Subdivision (or Division I FCS for short).

Year	Conference Champions	National Champion	Payton Award	Buchanan Award
1978	Big Sky Conference – Northern Arizona; Mid-Eastern Athletic Conference – South Carolina State; Ohio Valley Conference – Western Kentucky; Southwestern Athletic Conference – Grambling State; Yankee Conference – Massachusetts	Florida A&M		
1979	Big Sky Conference – Montana State; Mid-Eastern Athletic Conference – Morgan State; Ohio Valley Conference – Murray State; Southwestern Athletic Conference – Alcorn State and Grambling State; Yankee Conference – Boston U and Massachusetts	Eastern Kentucky		
1980	Big Sky Conference – Boise State; Mid-Eastern Athletic Conference – South Carolina State; Ohio Valley Conference – Western Kentucky; Southwestern Athletic Conference – Grambling State and Jackson State; Yankee Conference – Boston U	Boise State		
1981	Big Sky Conference – Idaho State; Mid-Continent Athletic Association – Eastern Illinois, Northern Iowa, and Western Illinois; Mid-Eastern Athletic Conference – South Carolina State; Ohio Valley Conference – Eastern Kentucky; Southwestern Athletic Conference – Jackson State; Yankee Conference – Massachusetts and Rhode Island	Idaho State		
1982	Association of Mid-Continent Universities – Eastern Illinois and Northern Iowa; Big Sky Conference – Montana; Ivy League – Dartmouth, Harvard, and Penn; Mid-Eastern Athletic Conference – South Carolina State; Ohio Valley Conference – Eastern Kentucky; Southern Conference – Furman; Southland Conference – Louisiana Tech; Southwestern Athletic Conference – Jackson State; Yankee Conference – Boston U, Connecticut, Maine, and Massachusetts	Eastern Kentucky (2)		
1983	Association of Mid-Continent Universities – Eastern Illinois; Big Sky Conference – Nevada; Ivy League – Harvard and Penn; Mid-Eastern Athletic Conference – South Carolina State; Ohio Valley Conference – Eastern Kentucky; Southern Conference – Furman; Southland Conference – Northeast Louisiana and North Texas State; Southwestern Athletic Conference – Grambling State; Yankee Conference – Boston U and Connecticut	Southern Illinois		
1984	Association of Mid-Continent Universities – Eastern Illinois, Northern Iowa, and Western Illinois; Big Sky Conference – Montana State; Ivy League – Penn; Mid-Eastern Athletic Conference – Bethune-Cookman; Ohio Valley Conference – Eastern Kentucky; Southern Conference – Chattanooga; Southland Conference – Louisiana Tech; Southwestern Athletic Conference – Alcorn State; Yankee Conference – Boston U and Rhode Island	Montana State		
1985	Big Sky Conference – Idaho; Gateway Collegiate Athletic Conference – Northern Iowa; Ivy League – Penn; Mid-Eastern Athletic Conference – Delaware State; Ohio Valley Conference – Middle Tennessee; Southern Conference – Furman; Southland Conference – Arkansas State; Southwestern Athletic Conference – Grambling State and Jackson State; Yankee Conference – Rhode Island	Georgia Southern		
1986	Big Sky Conference – Nevada; Colonial League – Holy Cross; Gateway Collegiate Athletic Conference – Eastern Illinois; Ivy League – Penn; Mid-Eastern Athletic Conference – North Carolina A&T; Ohio Valley Conference – Murray State; Southern Conference – Appalachian State; Southland Conference – Arkansas State; Southwestern Athletic Conference – Jackson State; Yankee Conference – Connecticut, Delaware, and Massachusetts	Georgia Southern (2)		
1987	Big Sky Conference – Idaho; Colonial League – Holy Cross; Gateway Collegiate Athletic Conference – Northern Iowa; Ivy League – Harvard; Mid-Eastern Athletic Conference – Howard; Ohio Valley Conference – Eastern Kentucky and Youngstown State; Southern Conference – Appalachian State; Southland Conference – Northeast Louisiana; Southwestern Athletic Conference – Jackson State; Yankee Conference – Maine and Richmond	Northeast Louisiana	Kenny Gamble – RB (Colgate)	
1988	Big Sky Conference – Idaho; Colonial League – Lafayette; Gateway Collegiate Athletic Conference – Western Illinois; Ivy League – Cornell and Penn; Mid-Eastern Athletic Conference – Bethune-Cookman, Delaware State, and Florida A&M; Ohio Valley Conference – Eastern Kentucky; Southern Conference – Furman and Marshall; Southland Conference – Northwestern State; Southwestern Athletic Conference – Jackson State; Yankee Conference – Delaware and Massachusetts	Furman	Dave Meggett – RB (Towson)	
1989	Big Sky Conference – Idaho; Colonial League – Holy Cross; Gateway Collegiate Athletic Conference – Southwest Missouri State; Ivy League – Princeton and Yale; Mid-Eastern Athletic Conference – Delaware State; Ohio Valley Conference – Middle Tennessee; Southern Conference – Furman; Southland Conference – Stephen F. Austin; Southwestern Athletic Conference – Jackson State; Yankee Conference – Connecticut, Maine, and Villanova	Georgia Southern (3)	John Friesz – QB (Idaho)	
1990	Big Sky Conference – Nevada; Gateway Collegiate Athletic Conference – Northern Iowa; Ivy League – Cornell and Dartmouth; Mid-Eastern Athletic Conference – Florida A&M; Ohio Valley Conference – Eastern Kentucky and Middle Tennessee; Patriot League – Holy Cross; Southern Conference – Furman; Southland Conference – Northeast Louisiana; Southwestern Athletic Conference – Jackson State; Yankee Conference – Massachusetts	Georgia Southern (4)	Walter Dean – RB (Grambling State)	
1991	Big Sky Conference – Nevada; Gateway Collegiate Athletic Conference – Northern Iowa; Ivy League – Dartmouth; Mid-Eastern Athletic Conference – North Carolina A&T; Ohio Valley Conference – Eastern Kentucky; Patriot League – Holy Cross; Southern Conference – Appalachian State; Southland Conference – McNeese State; Southwestern Athletic Conference – Alabama State; Yankee Conference – Delaware, New Hampshire, and Villanova	Youngstown State	Jamie Martin – QB (Weber State)	
1992	Big Sky Conference – Eastern Washington and Idaho; Gateway Football Conference – Northern Iowa; Ivy League – Dartmouth and Princeton; Mid-Eastern Athletic Conference – North Carolina A&T; Ohio Valley Conference – Middle Tennessee; Patriot League – Lafayette; Southern Conference – The Citadel; Southland Conference – Northeast Louisiana; Southwestern Athletic Conference – Alcorn State; Yankee Conference – Delaware	Marshall	Michael Payton – QB (Marshall)	
1993	American West Conference – Southern Utah and UC Davis; Big Sky Conference – Montana; Gateway Football Conference – Northern Iowa; Ivy League – Penn; Metro Atlantic Athletic Conference – Iona; Mid-Eastern Athletic Conference – Howard; Ohio Valley Conference – Eastern Kentucky; Patriot League – Lehigh; Pioneer Football League – Dayton; Southern Conference – Georgia Southern; Southland Conference – McNeese State; Southwestern Athletic Conference – Southern; Yankee Conference – Boston University	Youngstown State (2)	Doug Nussmeier – QB (Idaho)	
1994	American West Conference – Cal Poly; Big Sky Conference – Boise State; Gateway Football Conference – Northern Iowa; Ivy League – Penn; Metro Atlantic Athletic Conference – Marist and St. John's; Mid-Eastern Athletic Conference – South Carolina State; Ohio Valley Conference – Eastern Kentucky; Patriot League – Lafayette; Pioneer Football League – Butler and Dayton; Southern Conference – Marshall; Southland Conference – North Texas; Southwestern Athletic Conference – Alcorn State and Grambling State; Yankee Conference – New Hampshire	Youngstown State (3)	Steve McNair – QB (Alcorn State)	
1995	American West Conference – Sacramento State; Big Sky Conference – Montana; Gateway Football Conference – Eastern Illinois and Northern Iowa; Ivy League – Princeton; Metro Atlantic Athletic Conference – Duquesne; Mid-Eastern Athletic Conference – Florida A&M; Ohio Valley Conference – Murray State; Patriot League – Lehigh; Pioneer Football League – Drake; Southern Conference – Appalachian State; Southland Conference – McNeese State; Southwestern Athletic Conference – Jackson State; Yankee Conference – Delaware	Montana	Dave Dickenson – QB (Montana)	Dexter Coakley – LB (Appalachian State)
1996	Big Sky Conference – Montana; Gateway Football Conference – Northern Iowa; Ivy League – Dartmouth; Metro Atlantic Athletic Conference – Duquesne; Mid-Eastern Athletic Conference – Florida A&M; Northeast Conference – Monmouth and Robert Morris; Ohio Valley Conference – Murray State; Patriot League – Bucknell; Pioneer Football League – Dayton; Southern Conference – Marshall; Southland Football League – Troy State; Southwestern Athletic Conference – Jackson State; Yankee Conference – William & Mary	Marshall (2)	Archie Amerson – RB (Northern Arizona)	Dexter Coakley – LB (Appalachian State)
1997	Atlantic 10 Conference – Villanova; Big Sky Conference – Eastern Washington; Gateway Football Conference – Western Illinois; Ivy League – Harvard; Metro Atlantic Athletic Conference – Georgetown; Mid-Eastern Athletic Conference – Hampton; Northeast Conference – Robert Morris; Ohio Valley Conference – Eastern Kentucky; Patriot League – Colgate; Pioneer Football League – Dayton; Southern Conference – Georgia Southern; Southland Football League – McNeese State and Northwestern State; Southwestern Athletic Conference – Southern	Youngstown State (4)	Brian Finneran – WR (Villanova)	Chris McNeil – DE (North Carolina A&T)
1998	Atlantic 10 Conference – Richmond; Big Sky Conference – Montana; Gateway Football Conference – Western Illinois; Ivy League – Penn; Metro Atlantic Athletic Conference – Fairfield and Georgetown; Mid-Eastern Athletic Conference – Florida A&M and Hampton; Northeast Conference – Monmouth and Robert Morris; Ohio Valley Conference – Tennessee State; Patriot League – Lehigh; Pioneer Football League – Drake; Southern Conference – Georgia Southern; Southland Football League – Northwestern State; Southwestern Athletic Conference – Southern	Massachusetts	Jerry Azumah – RB (New Hampshire)	James Milton – LB (Western Illinois)
1999	Atlantic 10 Conference – James Madison and Massachusetts; Big Sky Conference – Montana; Gateway Football Conference – Illinois State; Ivy League – Brown and Yale; Metro Atlantic Athletic Conference – Duquesne; Mid-Eastern Athletic Conference – North Carolina A&T; Northeast Conference – Robert Morris; Ohio Valley Conference – Tennessee State; Patriot League – Colgate and Lehigh; Pioneer Football League – Dayton; Southern Conference – Appalachian State, Furman, and Georgia Southern; Southland Football League – Stephen F. Austin and Troy State; Southwestern Athletic Conference – Southern	Georgia Southern (5)	Adrian Peterson – RB (Georgia Southern)	Al Lucas – DT (Troy State)
2000	Atlantic 10 Conference – Delaware and Richmond; Big Sky Conference – Montana; Gateway Football Conference – Western Illinois; Ivy League – Penn; Metro Atlantic Athletic Conference – Duquesne; Mid-Eastern Athletic Conference – Florida A&M; Northeast Conference – Robert Morris; Ohio Valley Conference – Western Kentucky; Patriot League – Lehigh; Pioneer Football League – Dayton, Drake, and Valparaiso; Southern Conference – Georgia Southern; Southland Football League – Troy State; Southwestern Athletic Conference – Grambling State	Georgia Southern (6)	Louis Ivory – RB (Furman)	Edgerton Hartwell – LB (Western Illinois)
2001	Atlantic 10 Conference – Hofstra, Maine, Villanova, and William & Mary; Big Sky Conference – Montana; Gateway Football Conference – Northern Iowa; Ivy League – Harvard; Metro Atlantic Athletic Conference – Duquesne; Mid-Eastern Athletic Conference – Florida A&M; Northeast Conference – Sacred Heart; Ohio Valley Conference – Eastern Illinois; Patriot League – Lehigh; Pioneer Football League – Dayton; Southern Conference – Furman and Georgia Southern; Southland Football League – McNeese State and Sam Houston State; Southwestern Athletic Conference – Grambling State	Montana (2)	Brian Westbrook – RB (Villanova)	Derrick Lloyd – LB (James Madison)
2002	Atlantic 10 Conference – Maine and Northeastern; Big Sky Conference – Idaho State, Montana, and Montana State; Big South Conference – Gardner-Webb; Gateway Football Conference – Western Illinois and Western Kentucky; Ivy League – Penn; Metro Atlantic Athletic Conference – Duquesne; Mid-Eastern Athletic Conference – Bethune-Cookman; Northeast Conference – Albany; Ohio Valley Conference – Eastern Illinois and Murray State; Patriot League – Colgate and Fordham; Pioneer Football League – Dayton; Southern Conference – Georgian Southern; Southland Football League – McNeese State; Southwestern Athletic Conference – Grambling State	Western Kentucky	Tony Romo – QB (Eastern Illinois)	Rashean Mathis – FS (Bethune-Cookman)
2003	Atlantic 10 Conference – Delaware and Massachusetts; Big Sky Conference – Montana, Montana State, and Northern Arizona; Big South Conference – Gardner-Webb; Gateway Football Conference – Northern Iowa and Southern Illinois; Ivy League – Penn; Metro Atlantic Athletic Conference – Duquesne; Mid-Eastern Athletic Conference – North Carolina A&T; Northeast Conference – Albany and Monmouth; Ohio Valley Conference – Jacksonville State; Patriot League – Colgate; Pioneer Football League – Valparaiso; Southern Conference – Wofford; Southland Conference – McNeese State; Southwestern Athletic Conference – Southern	Delaware	Jamaal Branch – RB (Colgate)	Jared Allen – DE (Idaho State)
2004	Atlantic 10 Conference – Delaware, James Madison, and William & Mary; Big Sky Conference – Eastern Washington and Montana; Big South Conference – Coastal Carolina; Gateway Football Conference – Southern Illinois; Great West Football Conference – Cal Poly; Ivy League – Harvard; Metro Atlantic Athletic Conference – Duquesne; Mid-Eastern Athletic Conference – Hampton and South Carolina State; Northeast Conference – Central Connecticut State and Monmouth; Ohio Valley Conference – Jacksonville State; Patriot League – Lafayette and Lehigh; Pioneer Football League – Drake; Southern Conference – Furman and Georgia Southern; Southland Conference – Northwestern State and Sam Houston State; Southwestern Athletic Conference – Alabama State	James Madison	Lang Campbell – QB (William & Mary)	Jordan Beck – LB (Cal Poly)
2005	Atlantic 10 Conference – New Hampshire and Richmond; Big Sky Conference – Eastern Washington, Montana, and Montana State; Big South Conference – Charleston Southern and Coastal Carolina; Gateway Football Conference – Northern Iowa, Southern Illinois, and Youngstown State; Great West Football Conference – Cal Poly and UC Davis; Ivy League – Brown; Metro Atlantic Athletic Conference – Duquesne; Mid-Eastern Athletic Conference – Hampton; Northeast Conference – Central Connecticut State and Stony Brook; Ohio Valley Conference – Eastern Illinois; Patriot League – Colgate and Lafayette; Pioneer Football League – San Diego; Southern Conference – Appalachian State; Southland Conference – Nicholls State and Texas State; Southwestern Athletic Conference – Grambling State	Appalachian State	Erik Meyer – QB (Eastern Washington)	Chris Gocong – DE (Cal Poly)
2006	Atlantic 10 Conference (Note: The Atlantic 10 dropped football sponsorship after the 2006 season. All A-10 football teams moved to the Colonial Athletic Association, now known as the Coastal Athletic Association, which began operating the technically separate entity of CAA Football in the 2007 season.) – Massachusetts; Big Sky Conference – Montana; Big South Conference – Coastal Carolina; Gateway Football Conference – Youngstown State; Great West Football Conference – North Dakota State; Ivy League – Princeton and Yale; Metro Atlantic Athletic Conference – Duquesne and Marist; Mid-Eastern Athletic Conference – Hampton; Northeast Conference – Monmouth; Ohio Valley Conference – Eastern Illinois and Tennessee-Martin; Patriot League – Colgate, Lafayette, and Lehigh; Pioneer Football League – San Diego; Southern Conference – Appalachian State; Southland Conference – McNeese State; Southwestern Athletic Conference – Alabama A&M	Appalachian State (2)	Ricky Santos – QB (New Hampshire)	Kyle Shotwell – LB (Cal Poly)
2007	Big Sky Conference – Montana; Big South Conference – Liberty; CAA Football – Massachusetts and Richmond; Gateway Football Conference – Northern Iowa; Great West Football Conference – South Dakota State; Ivy League – Harvard; Metro Atlantic Athletic Conference – Duquesne, Iona, and Marist; Mid-Eastern Athletic Conference – Delaware State; Northeast Conference – Albany; Ohio Valley Conference – Eastern Kentucky; Patriot League – Fordham; Pioneer Football League – Dayton and San Diego; Southern Conference – Appalachian State and Wofford; Southland Conference – McNeese State; Southwestern Athletic Conference – Jackson State	Appalachian State (3)	Jayson Foster – QB (Georgia Southern)	Kroy Biermann – DE (Montana)
2008	Big Sky Conference – Montana and Weber State; Big South Conference – Liberty; CAA Football – James Madison; Great West Conference – Cal Poly; Ivy League – Brown and Harvard; Mid-Eastern Athletic Conference – South Carolina State; Missouri Valley Football Conference – Northern Iowa and Southern Illinois; Northeast Conference – Albany; Ohio Valley Conference – Eastern Kentucky; Patriot League – Colgate; Pioneer Football League – Jacksonville; Southern Conference – Appalachian State; Southland Conference – Texas State; Southwestern Athletic Conference – Grambling State	Richmond	Armanti Edwards – QB (Appalachian State)	Greg Peach – DE (Eastern Washington)
2009	Big Sky Conference – Montana; Big South Conference – Liberty and Stony Brook; CAA Football – Richmond and Villanova; Great West Conference – UC Davis; Ivy League – Pennsylvania; Mid-Eastern Athletic Conference – South Carolina State; Missouri Valley Football Conference – Southern Illinois; Northeast Conference – Central Connecticut State; Ohio Valley Conference – Eastern Illinois; Patriot League – Holy Cross; Pioneer Football League – Butler and Dayton; Southern Conference – Appalachian State; Southland Conference – McNeese State and Stephen F. Austin; Southwestern Athletic Conference – Prairie View A&M	Villanova	Armanti Edwards – QB (Appalachian State)	Arthur Moats – DE (James Madison)
2010	Big Sky Conference - Eastern Washington, Montana State; Big South Conference - Coastal Carolina, Liberty, Stony Brook; CAA Football - Delaware, William & Mary; Great West Conference - Southern Utah; Ivy League - Pennsylvania; Mid-Eastern Athletic Conference - Bethune-Cookman, Florida A&M, South Carolina State; Missouri Valley Football Conference - Northern Iowa; Northeast Conference - Central Connecticut State, Robert Morris; Ohio Valley Conference - Southeast Missouri State; Patriot League - Lehigh; Pioneer Football League - Dayton, Jacksonville; Southern Conference - Appalachian State, Wofford; Southland Conference - Stephen F. Austin; Southwestern Athletic Conference - Texas Southern	Eastern Washington	Jeremy Moses – QB (Stephen F. Austin)	J. C. Sherritt – LB (Eastern Washington)
2011	Big Sky Conference - Montana State; Big South Conference - Stony Brook; CAA Football - Towson; Great West Conference - Cal Poly, North Dakota; Ivy League - Harvard; Mid-Eastern Athletic Conference - Norfolk State; Missouri Valley Football Conference - North Dakota State, Northern Iowa; Northeast Conference - Albany, Duquesne; Ohio Valley Conference - Eastern Kentucky, Jacksonville State, Tennessee Tech; Patriot League - Lehigh; Pioneer Football League - Drake, San Diego; Southern Conference - Georgia Southern; Southland Conference - Sam Houston State; Southwestern Athletic Conference - Grambling State	North Dakota State	Bo Levi Mitchell – QB (Eastern Washington)	Matt Evans – LB (New Hampshire)
2012	Big Sky Conference – Eastern Washington, Montana State, Cal Poly; Big South Conference – Coastal Carolina, Liberty, Stony Brook; CAA Football – Old Dominion, New Hampshire, Richmond, Towson, Villanova; Ivy League – Pennsylvania; Mid-Eastern Athletic Conference – Bethune-Cookman; Missouri Valley Football Conference – North Dakota State; Northeast Conference – Wagner and Albany; Ohio Valley Conference – Eastern Illinois; Patriot League – Colgate; Pioneer Football League – Drake, San Diego and Butler; Southern Conference – Georgia Southern, Wofford and Appalachian State; Southland Conference – Central Arkansas and Sam Houston; Southwestern Athletic Conference – Arkansas-Pine Bluff	North Dakota State (2)	Taylor Heinicke – QB (Old Dominion)	Caleb Schreibeis – DE (Montana State)
2013	Big Sky Conference - Eastern Washington; Big South Conference - Coastal Carolina, Liberty; CAA Football - Maine; Ivy League - Harvard, Princeton; Mid-Eastern Athletic Association - Bethune-Cookman, South Carolina State; Missouri Valley Football Conference - North Dakota State; Northeast Conference - Duquesne, Sacred Heart; Ohio Valley Conference - Eastern Illinois; Patriot League - Lafayette; Pioneer Football League - Butler, Marist; Southern Conference - Chattanooga, Furman, Samford; Southland Conference - Southeastern Louisiana; Southwestern Athletic Conference - Southern	North Dakota State (3)	Jimmy Garoppolo – QB (Eastern Illinois)	Brad Daly – DE (Montana State)
2014	Big Sky Conference - Eastern Washington; Big South Conference - Coastal Carolina, Liberty; CAA Football - New Hampshire; Ivy League - Harvard, Princeton; Mid-Eastern Athletic Association - Bethune-Cookman, Morgan State, North Carolina A&T, North Carolina Central, South Carolina State; Missouri Valley Football Conference - Illinois State, North Dakota State; Northeast Conference - Sacred Heart, Wagner; Ohio Valley Conference - Jacksonville State; Patriot League - Fordham; Pioneer Football League - San Diego; Southern Conference - Chattanooga; Southland Conference - Sam Houston State, Southeastern Louisiana; Southwestern Athletic Conference - Alcorn State	North Dakota State (4)	John Robertson – QB (Villanova)	Kyle Emanuel – DE (North Dakota State)
2015	Big Sky Conference - Southern Utah; Big South Conference - Charleston Southern; CAA Football - James Madison, Richmond, William & Mary; Ivy League - Dartmouth, Harvard, Penn; Mid-Eastern Athletic Association - Bethune-Cookman, North Carolina A&T, North Carolina Central; Missouri Valley Football Conference - Illinois State, North Dakota State; Northeast Conference - Duquesne; Ohio Valley Conference - Jacksonville State; Patriot League - Colgate; Pioneer Football League - Dayton, San Diego; Southern Conference - Chattanooga, The Citadel; Southland Conference - McNeese State; Southwestern Athletic Conference - Alcorn State	North Dakota State (5)	Cooper Kupp – WR (Eastern Washington)	Deon King – LB (Norfolk State)
2016	Big Sky Conference - Eastern Washington, North Dakota; Big South Conference - Charleston Southern, Liberty; CAA Football - James Madison; Ivy League - Princeton, Penn; Mid-Eastern Athletic Association - North Carolina Central; Missouri Valley Football Conference - North Dakota State, South Dakota State; Northeast Conference - Duquesne, St Francis (PA); Ohio Valley Conference - Jacksonville State; Patriot League - Lehigh; Pioneer Football League - San Diego; Southern Conference - The Citadel; Southland Conference - Sam Houston State; Southwestern Athletic Conference - Grambling State	James Madison (2)	Jeremiah Briscoe – QB (Sam Houston State)	Karter Schult – DE (Northern Iowa)
2017	Big Sky Conference - Southern Utah, Weber State; Big South Conference - Kennesaw State; CAA Football - James Madison; Ivy League - Yale; Mid-Eastern Athletic Association - North Carolina A&T; Missouri Valley Football Conference - North Dakota State; Northeast Conference - Central Connecticut; Ohio Valley Conference - Jacksonville State; Patriot League - Colgate, Lehigh; Pioneer Football League - San Diego; Southern Conference - Wofford; Southland Conference - Central Arkansas; Southwestern Athletic Conference - Grambling State	North Dakota State (6)	Jeremiah Briscoe – QB (Sam Houston State)	Darius Jackson – DE (Jacksonville State)
2018	Big Sky Conference - Weber State, Eastern Washington, UC Davis; Big South Conference - Kennesaw State; CAA Football - Maine; Ivy League - Princeton; Mid-Eastern Athletic Association - North Carolina A&T; Missouri Valley Football Conference - North Dakota State; Northeast Conference - Duquesne, Sacred Heart; Ohio Valley Conference - Jacksonville State; Patriot League - Colgate; Pioneer Football League - San Diego; Southern Conference - Wofford, East Tennessee State, Furman; Southland Conference - Nicholls, Incarnate Word; Southwestern Athletic Conference - Alcorn State	North Dakota State (7)	Devlin Hodges – QB (Samford)	Zach Hall – LB (Southeast Missouri State)
2019	Big Sky Conference - Sacramento State, Weber State; Big South Conference - Monmouth; CAA Football - James Madison; Ivy League - Dartmouth, Yale; Mid-Eastern Athletic Association - North Carolina A&T, South Carolina State; Missouri Valley Football Conference - North Dakota State; Northeast Conference - Central Connecticut; Ohio Valley Conference - Austin Peay, Southeast Missouri State; Patriot League - Holy Cross; Pioneer Football League - San Diego; Southern Conference - Wofford; Southland Conference - Central Arkansas, Nicholls; Southwestern Athletic Conference - Alcorn State	North Dakota State (8)	Trey Lance QB (North Dakota State)	Dante Olson LB (Montana)
2020	Big Sky Conference - Weber State; Big South Conference - Monmouth; CAA Football - Delaware; Ivy League - No season Mid-Eastern Athletic Association - No champion Missouri Valley Football Conference - Missouri State, South Dakota State; Northeast Conference - Sacred Heart; Ohio Valley Conference - Jacksonville State; Patriot League - Holy Cross; Pioneer Football League - Davidson; Southern Conference - VMI; Southland Conference - Sam Houston State; Southwestern Athletic Conference - Alabama A&M	Sam Houston State	Cole Kelley QB (Southeastern Louisiana)	Jordan Lewis DL (Southern)
2021	Big Sky Conference - Sacramento State; Big South Conference - Kennesaw State; CAA Football - James Madison and Villanova; Ivy League - Dartmouth and Princeton; Mid-Eastern Athletic Association - South Carolina State; Missouri Valley Football Conference - North Dakota State; Northeast Conference - Sacred Heart; Ohio Valley Conference - UT Martin; Patriot League - Holy Cross; Pioneer Football League - Davidson and San Diego; Southern Conference - East Tennessee State; Southland Conference - Incarnate Word; Southwestern Athletic Conference - Jackson State; Western Athletic Conference - Sam Houston State	North Dakota State (9)	Eric Barriere QB (Eastern Washington)	Isaiah Land LB (Florida A&M)
2022	ASUN Conference - Jacksonville State; Big Sky Conference - Montana State and Sacramento State; Big South Conference - Gardner–Webb; CAA Football - New Hampshire and William & Mary; Ivy League - Yale; Mid-Eastern Athletic Association - Howard and North Carolina Central; Missouri Valley Football Conference - South Dakota State; Northeast Conference - Saint Francis (PA); Ohio Valley Conference - Southeast Missouri State and UT Martin; Patriot League - Holy Cross; Pioneer Football League - St. Thomas (MN); Southern Conference - Samford; Southland Conference - Incarnate Word and Southeastern Louisiana; Southwestern Athletic Conference - Jackson State; Western Athletic Conference - Abilene Christian and Stephen F. Austin	South Dakota State	Lindsey Scott Jr. QB (Incarnate Word)	Zeke Vandenburgh LB (Illinois State)
2023	Big Sky Conference - Montana; Big South–OVC - Gardner–Webb and UT Martin; CAA Football - Albany, Delaware, Richmond, and Villanova; Ivy League - Dartmouth, Harvard, and Yale; Mid-Eastern Athletic Association - Howard and North Carolina Central; Missouri Valley Football Conference - South Dakota State; Northeast Conference - Duquesne; Patriot League - Lafayette; Pioneer Football League - Drake; Southern Conference - Furman; Southland Conference - Nicholls; Southwestern Athletic Conference - Florida A&M; United Athletic Conference - Abilene Christian	South Dakota State (2)	Mark Gronowski QB (South Dakota State)	Terrell Allen DB (Tennessee State)
2024	Big Sky Conference - Montana State; Big South–OVC - Southeast Missouri State, Tennessee State, Tennessee Tech, and UT Martin; CAA Football - Rhode Island, Richmond (Note: Richmond had the best conference record at 8–0, compared to Rhode Island's 7–1. However, CAA Football recognizes both as co-champions because Rhode Island's only CAA loss was to Delaware, which was ineligible for the CAA Football championship and FCS playoffs due to its transition to Division I FBS.); Ivy League - Columbia, Dartmouth, and Harvard; Mid-Eastern Athletic Association - South Carolina State; Missouri Valley Football Conference - North Dakota State, South Dakota, and South Dakota State; Northeast Conference - Central Connecticut and Duquesne; Patriot League - Holy Cross and Lehigh; Pioneer Football League - Drake; Southern Conference - Mercer; Southland Conference - Incarnate Word; Southwestern Athletic Conference - Jackson State; United Athletic Conference - Abilene Christian	North Dakota State (10)	Tommy Mellott QB (Montana State)	David Walker LB (Central Arkansas)
2025	Big Sky Conference - Montana State; CAA Football - Rhode Island; Ivy League - Harvard and Yale; Mid-Eastern Athletic Association - South Carolina State; Missouri Valley Football Conference - North Dakota State; Northeast Conference - Central Connecticut; OVC–Big South - Tennessee Tech; Patriot League - Lehigh; Pioneer Football League - Drake; Southern Conference - Mercer; Southland Conference - Stephen F. Austin; Southwestern Athletic Conference - Prairie View A&M; United Athletic Conference - Abilene Christian and Tarleton State	Montana State (2)	Beau Brungard QB (Youngstown State)	Andrew Zock DE (Mercer)

== See also ==
- NCAA Division I Football Championship, championship game for I-AA/FCS played annually since 1978
- List of NCAA Division I-A/FBS football seasons
- List of NCAA Division II football seasons
- List of NCAA Division III football seasons
