= Mickey Matthews =

American football coach (born 1953)

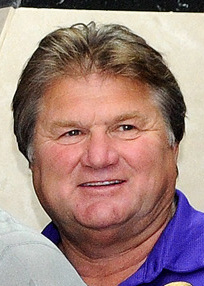
- Matthews in 2009

Biographical details
- Born: November 8, 1953 (age 72); Andrews, Texas, U.S.

Coaching career (HC unless noted)
- 1978: Kansas State (assistant)
- 1980–1981: West Texas State (DB)
- 1982–1985: UTEP (DB)
- 1986: Houston (DB)
- 1987: TCU (DB)
- 1988–1989: Southwest Texas State (DC)
- 1990–1995: Marshall (DC)
- 1996–1998: Georgia (DB/LB)
- 1999–2013: James Madison
- 2016–2017: Coastal Carolina (DC)
- 2020: Dallas Renegades (LB/DQC)

Head coaching record
- Overall: 109–71
- Tournaments: 7–5 (NCAA D-I-AA/D-I playoffs)

Accomplishments and honors

Championships
- 1 NCAA Division I-AA (2004); 2 Atlantic 10 (1999, 2004); 1 CAA (2008)

Awards
- 2× Eddie Robinson Award (1999, 2008); AFCA NCAA Division I-AA Coach of the Year (2004); Liberty Mutual FCS COY 2008); CAA Coach of the Year (2008)

Michael Chester "Mickey" Matthews (born November 8, 1953) is an American former football coach. He served as the head football coach at James Madison University (JMU) from 1999 to 2013, compiling a record of 109–71. Matthews coached the 2004 James Madison Dukes football team to an NCAA Division I-AA Football Championship.

== Early coaching career ==
Matthews started his coaching career as an assistant coach at Lamar Consolidated High School, in Texas, working with offensive backs. During the 1978 season, he joined Kansas State University, as an assistant coach. During the 1980 and 1981 seasons, he served as the defensive coordinator at his alma mater, West Texas State—now known as West Texas A&M University. From 1982 to 1985, he was an assistant coach at the University of Texas at El Paso (UTEP). In the following 1986 season, he worked at the University of Houston as a defensive backs coach. In the 1987 season, he held that same position at Texas Christian University (TCU). During the 1988 and 1989 seasons, he coached at Southwest Texas State University—now known as Texas State University. From 1990 to 1995, he served as the assistant head coach at Marshall University. From 1996 to 1998 he coached defensive backs and linebackers at the University of Georgia. The Georgia Bulldogs won two bowl games during his tenure. At Georgia, Matthews coached Champ Bailey, a consensus selection to the 1998 College Football All-America Team and the Washington Redskins first-round choice in the 1999 NFL draft. Matthews left Georgia in January 1999 to become the defensive coordinator at Baylor University, but resigned two months later to take the head coaching position at James Madison University.

== James Madison ==
From 1999 to 2013, Matthews was the head coach at James Madison University. The team had gone 3–8 in the year before, but Matthews turned them around that season and led them to an 8–4 record, an Atlantic 10 Conference title, and the school's first postseason appearance since 1995. Matthews won the Eddie Robinson Award that year, annually given to the top head coach in NCAA Division I-AA football. Five years later, after failing to make the postseason four years in a row, the Dukes finally made the playoffs again. They became the first team to win three straight road games on the way to an NCAA Division I-AA Football Championship, defeating the Montana Grizzlies, 31–21, in the 2004 Championship Game. The Dukes made the playoffs again in 2006 and 2007, losing in the first round each time. On February 25, 2008, amidst rumors that he might leave James Madison to help start the football program at the University of South Alabama, Matthews signed an extension with JMU to coach through the 2012 season. On September 27, 2008, JMU beat University of Maine 24–10, earning Matthews his 68th career win at JMU to become the school's all-time winningest coach. On November 22, 2008, the Matthews led Dukes defeated Towson University to finish conference play undefeated, winning the CAA outright and qualifying for their third straight FCS playoff appearance. On January 7, 2010, Matthews signed a one-year extension to his contract which extended through the 2013 season. During the 2012 season, Matthews gained his 100th career win in a hard-fought, 13–10 victory against conference foe Towson.

On November 25, 2013, JMU athletic director Jeff Bourne announced that Matthews had been fired. This came after the Dukes finished the 2013 season 6–6 and missed the FCS playoffs for the fourth time since advancing to the NCAA Semifinals in 2008.

=== 2010 Virginia Tech victory ===
On September 11, 2010, the Dukes upset then No. 13 Virginia Tech, 21–16 in front of 66,233 at Lane Stadium in Blacksburg. James Madison became the second NCAA Division I Football Championship Subdivision (FCS) team in college football history to knock off a ranked NCAA Division I Football Bowl Subdivision (FBS) opponent, following Appalachian State, which upset No. 5 Michigan in 2007. Later that season the Hokies went on to win the ACC Championship and finished ranked #15, making the JMU upset even more remarkable, especially considering that the Dukes finished the season with a 6–5 record (5–5 against FCS competition). After the game, Matthews referred to the victory as "the biggest win in my professional career"—even bigger than the 2004 national championship.

== Later coaching career ==
After his firing, Matthews joined Coastal Carolina as defensive coordinator in 2016. On December 7, 2017, he announced his retirement from coaching.

In 2019, he was hired by Dallas Renegades head coach Bob Stoops as linebackers and defensive quality control coach.

== Head coaching record ==
Year	Team	Overall	Conference	Standing	Bowl/playoffs	TSN^{#}
James Madison Dukes (Atlantic 10 Conference) (1999–2006)
1999	James Madison	8–4	7–1	T–1st	L NCAA Division I-AA First Round	13
2000	James Madison	6–5	4–4	4th		25
2001	James Madison	2–9	0–9	11th		
2002	James Madison	5–7	3–6	9th		
2003	James Madison	6–6	4–5	7th		
2004	James Madison	13–2	7–1	T–1st	W NCAA Division I-AA Championship	1
2005	James Madison	7–4	5–3	2nd (South)		25
2006	James Madison	9–3	7–1	1st (South)	L NCAA Division I First Round	9
James Madison Dukes (Colonial Athletic Association) (2007–2013)
2007	James Madison	8–4	6–2	2nd (South)	L NCAA Division I First Round	12
2008	James Madison	12–2	8–0	1st (South)	L NCAA Division I Semifinal	3
2009	James Madison	6–5	4–4	T–5th (South)		
2010	James Madison	6–5	3–5	T–8th		
2011	James Madison	8–5	5–3	T–5th	L NCAA Division I Second Round	15
2012	James Madison	7–4	5–3	6th		19
2013	James Madison	6–6	3–5	T–9th		
James Madison:		109–71	71–52			
Total:		109–71				
National championship Conference title Conference division title or championship game berth
