= 2004 NCAA Division I-AA Football Championship Game =

Postseason college football game

2004 NCAA Division I-AA Football Championship
- I-AA National Championship Game
James Madison Dukes	Montana Grizzlies
(12–2)	(12–2)
Atlantic 10	Big Sky
31	21
Head coach: Mickey Matthews	Head coach: Bobby Hauck
TSN / Seed; 8 / —	TSN / Seed; 7 / —
	1	2	3	4	Total
James Madison	0	10	14	7	31
Montana	7	0	14	0	21
- Date: December 17, 2004
- Season: 2004
- Stadium: Finley Stadium
- Location: Chattanooga, Tennessee
- Referee: G. Hartleb
- Attendance: 16,771

United States TV coverage
- Network: ESPN2

The 2004 NCAA Division I-AA Football Championship Game was a postseason college football game between the James Madison Dukes and the Montana Grizzlies. The game was played on December 17, 2004, at Finley Stadium, home field of the University of Tennessee at Chattanooga. The culminating game of the 2004 NCAA Division I-AA football season, it was won by James Madison, 31–21.

== Teams ==
The participants of the Championship Game were the finalists of the 2004 I-AA Playoffs, which began with a 16-team bracket.

=== James Madison Dukes ===
James Madison finished their regular season with a 9–2 record (7–1 in conference). One of their losses was to West Virginia of Division I-A. The Dukes, unseeded in the tournament, defeated Lehigh, second-seed Furman, and third-seed William & Mary to reach the final. This was the first appearance for James Madison in a Division I-AA championship game.

=== Montana Grizzlies ===
Montana finished their regular season with a 9–2 record (6–1 in conference). The Grizzlies, also unseeded in the tournament, defeated Northwestern State, New Hampshire, and Sam Houston State to reach the final. This was the fifth appearance for Montana in a Division I-AA championship game; they had won in 1995 and 2001, and lost in 1996 and 2000.

== Game summary ==
=== Scoring summary ===
Scoring summary

Quarter	Time	Drive			Team	Scoring information	Score	
Quarter	Time	Plays	Yards	TOP	Team	Scoring information	JMU	MONT
1	10:08	11	71	4:52	MONT	Jefferson Heidelberger 3-yard touchdown reception from Craig Ochs, Dan Carpenter kick good	0	7
2	8:54	14	74	6:27	JMU	28-yard field goal by David Rabil	3	7
2	0:16	13	71	5:05	JMU	Maurice Fenner 1-yard touchdown run, Rabil kick good	10	7
3	11:58	6	80	3:02	JMU	Justin Rascati 11-yard touchdown run, Rabil kick good	17	7
3	8:51	9	75	3:01	MONT	Levander Segars 17-yard touchdown reception from Ochs, Carpenter kick good	17	14
3	7:29	3	29	0:24	MONT	Willie Walden 8-yard touchdown reception from Ochs, Carpenter kick good	17	21
3	3:25	9	72	3:57	JMU	Fenner 1-yard touchdown run, Rabil kick good	24	21
4	8:00	16	80	7:05	JMU	Rascati 6-yard touchdown run, Rabil kick good	31	21
"TOP" = time of possession. For other American football terms, see Glossary of American football.							31	21

=== Game statistics ===
	1	2	3	4	Total
Dukes	0	10	14	7	31
Grizzlies	7	0	14	0	21

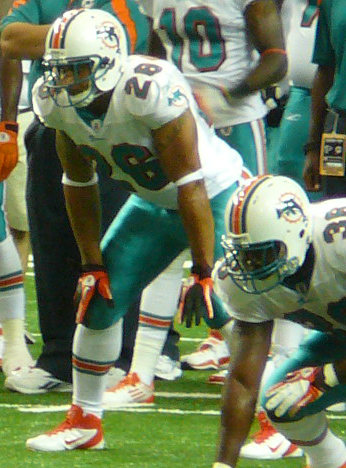
Montana running back Lex Hilliard

Statistics	JMU	MONT
First downs	32	21
Plays–yards	79–446	61–415
Rushes–yards	61–314	23–44
Passing yards	132	371
Passing: comp–att–int	13–18–0	29–38–1
Time of possession	36:13	23:47

Team	Category	Player	Statistics
James Madison	Passing	Justin Rascati	13–18, 132 yds
James Madison	Rushing	Maurice Fenner	29 car, 164 yds, 2 TD
James Madison	Receiving	Tom Ridley	3 rec, 32 yds
Montana	Passing	Craig Ochs	29–38, 371 yds, 3 TD, 1 INT
Montana	Rushing	Lex Hilliard	12 car, 26 yds
Montana	Receiving	Jon Talmage	6 rec, 84 yds
