= 2004 Richmond Spiders football team =

American college football season

2004 Richmond Spiders football
- Conference: Atlantic 10 Conference
- Record: 3–8 (2–6 A-10)
- Head coach: Dave Clawson (1st season)
- Offensive coordinator: Wayne Lineburg (1st season)
- Defensive coordinator: Russ Huesman (1st season)
- Home stadium: University of Richmond Stadium

2004 Atlantic 10 Conference football standings
	Conf.			Overall
Team	W		L	W		L
North Division
No. 6 New Hampshire x^	6	–	2	11	–	3
UMass	4	–	4	6	–	5
Northeastern	4	–	4	5	–	6
Hofstra	3	–	5	5	–	6
Maine	3	–	5	5	–	6
Rhode Island	2	–	6	4	–	7
South Division
No. 1 James Madison x^	7	–	1	13	–	2
No. 3 William & Mary x^	7	–	1	11	–	3
No. 7 Delaware x^	7	–	1	9	–	4
Villanova	3	–	5	6	–	5
Richmond	2	–	6	3	–	8
Towson	0	–	8	3	–	8
x – Division champion/co-champions; ^ – NCAA Division I-AA playoff participant; Rankings from The Sports Network poll

The 2004 Richmond Spiders football team represented the University of Richmond during the 2004 NCAA Division I-AA football season. Richmond competed as a member of the Atlantic 10 Conference (A-10), and played their home games at the University of Richmond Stadium.

The Spiders were led by first-year head coach Dave Clawson, who was previously head coach at Fordham University. Richmond finished the regular season with a 3–8 overall record and 2–6 record in conference play.

== Schedule ==
Date	Time	Opponent	Site	TV	Result	Attendance
September 4	6:00 pm	at NC State*	Carter–Finley Stadium; Raleigh, NC	CN8	L 0–42	55,600
September 11	12:00 pm	at VMI*	Alumni Memorial Field; Lexington, VA	CN8	W 34–7	6,245
September 18	1:00 pm	at No. 9 UMass	Warren McGuirk Alumni Stadium; Hadley, MA		W 24–14	4,986
September 25	1:00 pm	Lafayette*	University of Richmond Stadium; Richmond, VA		L 16–21	5,121
October 9	3:00 pm	No. 12 Maine	University of Richmond Stadium; Richmond, VA		L 25–29	5,031
October 16	1:00 pm	at No. 24 Villanova	Villanova Stadium; Villanova, PA		L 10–49	5,621
October 23	3:00 pm	No. 13 James Madison^{†}	University of Richmond Stadium; Richmond, VA (rivalry)		L 20–26	10,235
October 30	12:00 pm	at Hofstra	Shuart Stadium; Hempstead, NY	CN8	L 17–48	2,139
November 6	1:00 pm	Towson	University of Richmond Stadium; Richmond, VA		W 24–0	4,427
November 13	1:00 pm	No. 11 Delaware	University of Richmond Stadium; Richmond, VA		L 14–23	5,028
November 20	1:00 pm	at No. 6 William & Mary	Zable Stadium; Williamsburg, VA (I-64 Bowl)		L 14–38	8,325
*Non-conference game; ^{†}Homecoming; Rankings from The Sports Network Poll released prior to the game; All times are in Eastern time

== Coaching staff ==
Name	Position	Seasons at Richmond	Alma mater
Dave Clawson	Head coach	1	Williams
Russ Huesman	Defensive coordinator / Secondary	1	Chattanooga
Wayne Lineburg	Offensive coordinator / Running backs	1	Virginia
Ben Albert	Special teams coordinator / Defensive line	1	UMass
Mike Elko	Linebackers / Recruiting coordinator	1	Penn
Bill Durkin	Offensive line	8	UMass
Marcus Satterfield	Wide receivers	1	East Tennessee State
Mark Carney	Quarterbacks	1	Fordham
Jay Bateman	Assistant secondary	1	Randolph–Macon
Jeff Hanson	Tight ends	24	Richmond
Patrick Graham	Assistant defensive line	1	Yale
