= 2004 Maine Black Bears football team =

American college football season

2004 Maine Black Bears football
- Conference: Atlantic 10 Conference
- North Division
- Record: 5–6 (3–5 A-10)
- Head coach: Jack Cosgrove (12th season)
- Offensive coordinator: Bobby Wilder (5th season)
- Defensive coordinator: Rich Nagy (4th season)
- Captains: Mike Leconte; Marcus Walton; Marcus Williams
- Home stadium: Alfond Stadium

2004 Atlantic 10 Conference football standings
| | Conf. | | | Overall |
| Team | W | | L | W | | L |
|---|---|---|---|---|---|---|
North Division
| No. 6 New Hampshire x^ | 6 | – | 2 | 11 | – | 3 |
| UMass | 4 | – | 4 | 6 | – | 5 |
| Northeastern | 4 | – | 4 | 5 | – | 6 |
| Hofstra | 3 | – | 5 | 5 | – | 6 |
| Maine | 3 | – | 5 | 5 | – | 6 |
| Rhode Island | 2 | – | 6 | 4 | – | 7 |
South Division
| No. 1 James Madison x^ | 7 | – | 1 | 13 | – | 2 |
| No. 3 William & Mary x^ | 7 | – | 1 | 11 | – | 3 |
| No. 7 Delaware x^ | 7 | – | 1 | 9 | – | 4 |
| Villanova | 3 | – | 5 | 6 | – | 5 |
| Richmond | 2 | – | 6 | 3 | – | 8 |
| Towson | 0 | – | 8 | 3 | – | 8 |
x – Division champion/co-champions; ^ – NCAA Division I-AA playoff participant; Rankings from The Sports Network poll

The 2004 Maine Black Bears football team was an American football team that represented the University of Maine as a member of the Atlantic 10 Conference during the 2004 NCAA Division I-AA football season. In their 12th season under head coach Jack Cosgrove, the Black Bears compiled a 5–6 record (3–5 against conference opponents) and finished in a three-way tie for sixth place in the conference. Mike Leconte, Marcus Walton, and Marcus Williams were the team captains.

== Schedule ==
| Date | Opponent | Rank | Site | Result | Attendance | Source |
|---|---|---|---|---|---|---|
| September 4 | at No. 3 Montana | No. 11 | Washington–Grizzly Stadium; Missoula, MT | L 20–27 | 23,228 | |
| September 11 | No. 23 Northern Colorado | No. 17 | Alfond Stadium; Orono, ME | W 38–0 | 10,048 | |
| September 18 | at Mississippi State | No. 15 | Davis Wade Stadium; Starkville, Mississippi | W 9–7 | 43,486 | |
| October 2 | at No. 4 Delaware | No. 8 | Delaware Stadium; Newark, DE | L 38–43 | 22,030 | |
| October 9 | at Richmond | No. 12 | University of Richmond Stadium; Richmond, VA | W 29–25 | 5,031 | |
| October 16 | No. 17 James Madison | No. 12 | Alfond Stadium; Orono, ME | L 20–24 | 7,084 | |
| October 23 | Northeastern | No. 19 | Alfond Stadium; Orono, ME | W 35–26 | 8,057 | |
| October 30 | at UMass | No. 19 | McGuirk Stadium; Hadley, MA | L 34–35 ^{OT} | 5,632 | |
| November 6 | Hofstra | | Alfond Stadium; Orono, ME | L 20–31 | 4,239 | |
| November 13 | at Rhode Island | | Meade Stadium; Kingston, RI | W 42–28 | 2,068 | |
| November 20 | No. 5 New Hampshire | | Alfond Stadium; Orono, ME (Battle for the Brice–Cowell Musket) | L 36–50 | 4,301 | |
Rankings from The Sports Network Poll released prior to the game
