= 2004 NCAA Division I-AA football season =

American college football season

2004 NCAA Division I-AA season

Regular season
- Number of teams: 122
- Duration: August 28–November
- Payton Award: QB Lang Campbell, William & Mary
- Buchanan Award: LB Jordan Beck, Cal Poly

Playoff
- Duration: November 27–December 17
- Championship date: December 17, 2004
- Championship site: Finley Stadium; Chattanooga, Tennessee
- Champion: James Madison

NCAA Division I-AA football seasons
- «2003 2005»

The 2004 NCAA Division I-AA football season, part of college football in the United States organized by the National Collegiate Athletic Association at the Division I-AA level, began on August 28, 2004, and concluded with the 2004 NCAA Division I-AA Football Championship Game on December 17, 2004, at Finley Stadium in Chattanooga, Tennessee. James Madison won its first I-AA championship, defeating Montana by a final score of 31−21.

== Conference changes and new programs ==
- Prior to the season, the Great West Conference was formed as a football-only conference for six unaffiliated teams from California, Colorado, North Dakota, South Dakota, and Utah. A seventh prospective member, St. Mary's (CA), dropped their football program before the start of the season.

School	2003 Conference	2004 Conference
Cal Poly	I-AA Independent	Great West
East Tennessee State	Southern	Dropped Program
North Dakota State	North Central (D-II)	Great West (I-AA)
Northern Colorado	D-II Independent	Great West (I-AA)
Siena	MAAC	Dropped Program
St. Mary's (CA)	I-AA Independent	Dropped Program
Southern Utah	I-AA Independent	Great West
South Dakota State	North Central (D-II)	Great West (I-AA)
Towson	Patriot	Atlantic 10
UC Davis	D-II Independent	Great West (I-AA)

== I-AA team wins over I-A teams ==
List of I-AA/FCS victories from the NCAA:

- September 4 – Florida Atlantic 35, Hawaii 28 ^{OT}
- September 11 – Florida Atlantic 20, North Texas 13
- September 11 – New Hampshire 35, Rutgers 24
- September 18 – Florida Atlantic 27, Middle Tennessee 20
- September 18 – Maine 9, Mississippi State 7
- September 25 – Eastern Illinois 31, Eastern Michigan 28

== Conference standings ==
2004 Atlantic 10 Conference football standings
	Conf.			Overall
Team	W		L	W		L
North Division
No. 6 New Hampshire x^	6	–	2	11	–	3
UMass	4	–	4	6	–	5
Northeastern	4	–	4	5	–	6
Hofstra	3	–	5	5	–	6
Maine	3	–	5	5	–	6
Rhode Island	2	–	6	4	–	7
South Division
No. 1 James Madison x^	7	–	1	13	–	2
No. 3 William & Mary x^	7	–	1	11	–	3
No. 7 Delaware x^	7	–	1	9	–	4
Villanova	3	–	5	6	–	5
Richmond	2	–	6	3	–	8
Towson	0	–	8	3	–	8
x – Division champion/co-champions; ^ – NCAA Division I-AA playoff participant; Rankings from The Sports Network poll

2004 Big Sky Conference football standings
	Conf.			Overall
Team	W		L	W		L
No. 2 Montana $^	6	–	1	12	–	3
No. 8 Eastern Washington ^	6	–	1	9	–	4
Montana State	4	–	3	6	–	5
Portland State	4	–	3	7	–	4
Northern Arizona	3	–	4	4	–	7
Idaho State	2	–	5	3	–	8
Sacramento State	2	–	5	3	–	8
Weber State	1	–	6	1	–	10
$ – Conference champion; ^ – NCAA Division I-AA playoff participant; Rankings from The Sports Network poll

2004 Big South Conference football standings
	Conf.			Overall
Team	W		L	W		L
No. 24 Coastal Carolina $	4	–	0	10	–	1
Liberty	3	–	1	6	–	5
Gardner–Webb	2	–	2	5	–	6
Charleston Southern	1	–	3	5	–	5
VMI	0	–	4	0	–	11
$ – Conference champion; Rankings from The Sports Network poll

2004 Gateway Football Conference standings
	Conf.			Overall
Team	W		L	W		L
No. 9 Southern Illinois $^	7	–	0	10	–	2
No. 11 Western Kentucky ^	6	–	1	9	–	3
No. 25 Northern Iowa	5	–	2	7	–	4
Southwest Missouri State	3	–	4	6	–	5
Western Illinois	2	–	5	4	–	7
Illinois State	2	–	5	4	–	7
Youngstown State	2	–	5	4	–	7
Indiana State	1	–	6	4	–	7
$ – Conference champion; ^ – NCAA Division I-AA playoff participant; Rankings from The Sports Network poll

2004 Great West Conference football standings
	Conf.			Overall
Team	W		L	W		L
No. 16 Cal Poly $	4	–	1	9	–	2
UC Davis	3	–	2	6	–	4
No. 23 North Dakota State	2	–	3	8	–	3
South Dakota State	2	–	3	6	–	5
Southern Utah	2	–	3	6	–	5
Northern Colorado	2	–	3	2	–	9
$ – Conference champion; Rankings from The Sports Network poll

2004 Ivy League football standings
	Conf.			Overall
Team	W		L	W		L
No. 13 Harvard $	7	–	0	10	–	0
No. 21 Penn	6	–	1	8	–	2
Cornell	4	–	3	4	–	6
Brown	3	–	4	6	–	4
Princeton	3	–	4	5	–	5
Yale	3	–	4	5	–	5
Dartmouth	1	–	6	1	–	9
Columbia	1	–	6	1	–	9
$ – Conference champion; Rankings from The Sports Network poll

2004 Metro Atlantic Athletic Conference football standings
	Conf.			Overall
Team	W		L	W		L
Duquesne $	4	–	0	7	–	3
Marist	3	–	1	3	–	6
La Salle	1	–	3	3	–	7
Saint Peter's	1	–	3	3	–	7
Iona	1	–	3	2	–	8
$ – Conference champion

2004 Mid-Eastern Athletic Conference football standings
	Conf.			Overall
Team	W		L	W		L
No. 12 Hampton +^	6	–	1	10	–	2
No. 22 South Carolina State +	6	–	1	9	–	2
Bethune–Cookman	4	–	3	6	–	4
Delaware State	4	–	3	4	–	7
Howard	3	–	4	6	–	5
Morgan State	3	–	4	5	–	6
North Carolina A&T	1	–	6	3	–	8
Norfolk State	1	–	6	1	–	8
+ – Conference co-champions; ^ – NCAA Division I-AA playoff participant; Rankings from The Sports Network poll

2004 Northeast Conference football standings
	Conf.			Overall
Team	W		L	W		L
Monmouth +	6	–	1	10	–	1
Central Connecticut State +	6	–	1	8	–	2
Albany	4	–	3	4	–	7
Sacred Heart	3	–	4	6	–	4
Robert Morris	3	–	4	6	–	5
Wagner	3	–	4	6	–	5
Stony Brook	2	–	5	3	–	7
Saint Francis (PA)	1	–	6	3	–	8
+ – Conference co-champions

2004 Ohio Valley Conference football standings
	Conf.			Overall
Team	W		L	W		L
No. 14 Jacksonville State $^	7	–	1	9	–	2
Murray State	6	–	2	7	–	4
Eastern Kentucky	6	–	2	6	–	5
Eastern Illinois	4	–	4	5	–	6
Tennessee Tech	3	–	4	6	–	5
Samford	3	–	5	4	–	7
Southeast Missouri State	3	–	5	3	–	8
Tennessee State	2	–	5	4	–	7
Tennessee–Martin	1	–	7	2	–	9
$ – Conference champion; ^ – NCAA Division I-AA playoff participant; Rankings from The Sports Network poll

2004 Patriot League football standings
	Conf.			Overall
Team	W		L	W		L
No. 15 Lehigh +^	5	–	1	9	–	3
No. 19 Lafayette +^	5	–	1	8	–	4
Bucknell	4	–	2	7	–	4
Colgate	4	–	2	7	–	4
Fordham	2	–	4	5	–	6
Holy Cross	1	–	5	3	–	8
Georgetown	0	–	6	3	–	8
+ – Conference co-champions; ^ – NCAA Division I-AA playoff participant; Rankings from The Sports Network poll

2004 Pioneer Football League standings
	Conf.			Overall
Team	W		L	W		L
North Division
Drake xy$	4	–	0	10	–	2
San Diego	3	–	1	7	–	4
Dayton	2	–	2	7	–	3
Valparaiso	1	–	3	5	–	6
Butler	0	–	4	1	–	10
South Division
Morehead State xy	2	–	1	6	–	6
Jacksonville x	2	–	1	3	–	7
Davidson	1	–	2	2	–	7
Austin Peay	1	–	2	2	–	9
Championship: Drake 20, Morehead State 17
$ – Conference champion; x – Division champion/co-champions; y – Championship game participant

2004 Southern Conference football standings
	Conf.			Overall
Team	W		L	W		L
No. 5 Furman $^	6	–	1	10	–	3
No. 10 Georgia Southern $^	6	–	1	9	–	3
No. 18 Wofford	4	–	3	8	–	3
Appalachian State	4	–	3	6	–	5
Western Carolina	2	–	5	4	–	7
The Citadel	2	–	5	3	–	7
Elon	2	–	5	3	–	8
Chattanooga	2	–	5	2	–	9
$ – Conference champion; ^ – NCAA Division I-AA playoff participant; Rankings from The Sports Network I-AA Poll

2004 Southland Conference football standings
	Conf.			Overall
Team	W		L	W		L
No. 4 Sam Houston State +^	4	–	1	11	–	3
No. 17 Northwestern State +^	4	–	1	8	–	4
Texas State	3	–	2	5	–	6
Nicholls State	2	–	3	5	–	5
Stephen F. Austin	1	–	4	6	–	4
McNeese State	1	–	4	4	–	7
+ – Conference co-champions; ^ – NCAA Division I-AA playoff participant; Rankings from The Sports Network poll

2004 Southwestern Athletic Conference football standings
	Conf.			Overall
Team	W		L	W		L
East
No. 20 Alabama State xy$	6	–	1	10	–	2
Alabama A&M	5	–	2	7	–	4
Alcorn State	4	–	3	7	–	4
Jackson State	3	–	4	4	–	7
Mississippi Valley State	1	–	6	3	–	8
West
Southern xy	6	–	1	8	–	4
Arkansas–Pine Bluff	5	–	2	6	–	3
Grambling State	3	–	4	6	–	5
Prairie View A&M	1	–	6	3	–	8
Texas Southern	0	–	7	0	–	11
Championship: Alabama State 40, Southern 35
$ – Conference champion; x – Division champion/co-champions; y – Championship game participant; Rankings from The Sports Network Poll

2004 NCAA Division I-AA independents football standings
	Conf.			Overall
Team	W		L	W		L
Florida Atlantic		–		9	–	3
Southeastern Louisiana		–		7	–	4
FIU		–		3	–	7
Savannah State		–		2	–	8

== Postseason ==
=== NCAA Division I-AA playoff bracket ===
First Round
November 27
Campus sites

Quarterfinals
December 4
Campus sites

Semifinals
December 10 and December 11
Campus sites

National Championship Game

December 17
Finley Stadium
Chattanooga, Tennessee

1
Southern Illinois* (10–1)
31

Eastern Washington (8–3)
35

Eastern Washington*
34

Sam Houston State
35

Sam Houston State* (9–2)
54

Western Kentucky (9–2)
24

Sam Houston State
13

Montana*
34

Montana* (9–2)
56

Northwestern State (8–3)
7

Montana*
47

New Hampshire
17

New Hampshire (9–2)
27

4
Georgia Southern* (9–2)
3

7
Montana
21

8
James Madison
31

3
William & Mary* (9–2)
42

Hampton (10–1)
35

3
William & Mary*
44

Delaware
38

Delaware* (8–3)
28

Lafayette (8–3)
14

3
William & Mary*
34

James Madison
48

James Madison (9–2)
14

Lehigh* (9–2)
13

James Madison
14

2
Furman*
13

Jacksonville State (9–1)
7

2
Furman* (9–2)
49

* Denotes host institution
