= 2004 Saint Francis Red Flash football team =

American college football season

2004 Saint Francis Red Flash football
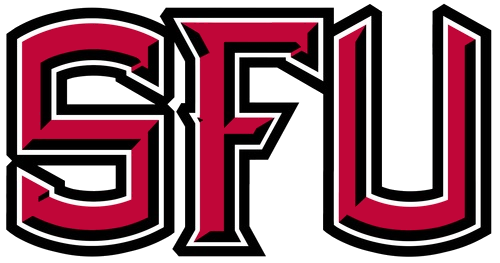
- Conference: Northeast Conference
- Record: 3–8 (1–6 NEC)
- Head coach: Dave Opfar (3rd season)
- Home stadium: Pine Bowl

2004 Northeast Conference football standings
	Conf.			Overall
Team	W		L	W		L
Monmouth +	6	–	1	10	–	1
Central Connecticut State +	6	–	1	8	–	2
Albany	4	–	3	4	–	7
Sacred Heart	3	–	4	6	–	4
Robert Morris	3	–	4	6	–	5
Wagner	3	–	4	6	–	5
Stony Brook	2	–	5	3	–	7
Saint Francis (PA)	1	–	6	3	–	8
+ – Conference co-champions

The 2004 Saint Francis Red Flash football team represented Saint Francis University as a member of the Northeast Conference (NEC) during the 2004 NCAA Division I-AA football season. The Red Flash were led by third-year head coach Dave Opfar and played their home games at the Pine Bowl. They finished the season 3–8 overall and 1–6 in NEC play to place last.

== Schedule ==
Date	Time	Opponent	Site	Result	Attendance
September 4	1:00 p.m.	at Georgetown*	Harbin Field; Washington, DC	L 7–36	1,671
September 11	1:00 p.m.	Sacred Heart	Pine Bowl; Loretto, PA	W 35–28	738
September 18	1:00 p.m.	Valparaiso*	Pine Bowl; Loretto, PA	W 17–13	850
September 25	1:00 p.m.	Robert Morris	Pine Bowl; Loretto, PA	L 10–28	910
October 2	1:00 p.m.	La Salle*	Pine Bowl; Loretto, PA	W 45–42	940
October 9		at Albany	University Field; Albany, NY	L 0–38	
October 16	1:00 p.m.	Stony Brook	Pine Bowl; Loretto, PA	L 21–29	534
October 23	1:00 p.m.	at Central Connecticut State	Arute Field; New Britain, CT	L 17–35	2,457
October 30	1:00 p.m.	at Morehead State*	Jayne Stadium; Morehead, KY	L 2–7	3,783
November 6	1:00 p.m.	Wagner	Pine Bowl; Loretto, PA	L 14–17	1,045
November 13	1:00 p.m.	Monmouth	Kessler Field; West Long Branch, NJ	L 39–49	1,889
*Non-conference game; All times are in Eastern time
