= 2004 UMass Minutemen football team =

American college football season

2004 UMass Minutemen football
- Conference: Atlantic 10 Conference
- North Division
- Record: 6–5 (4–4 A-10)
- Head coach: Don Brown (1st season)
- Offensive coordinator: Kevin Morris (1st season)
- Offensive scheme: Pro-style
- Defensive coordinator: Keith Dudzinski (1st season)
- Base defense: 4–3
- Home stadium: Warren McGuirk Alumni Stadium

2004 Atlantic 10 Conference football standings
	Conf.			Overall
Team	W		L	W		L
North Division
No. 6 New Hampshire x^	6	–	2	11	–	3
UMass	4	–	4	6	–	5
Northeastern	4	–	4	5	–	6
Hofstra	3	–	5	5	–	6
Maine	3	–	5	5	–	6
Rhode Island	2	–	6	4	–	7
South Division
No. 1 James Madison x^	7	–	1	13	–	2
No. 3 William & Mary x^	7	–	1	11	–	3
No. 7 Delaware x^	7	–	1	9	–	4
Villanova	3	–	5	6	–	5
Richmond	2	–	6	3	–	8
Towson	0	–	8	3	–	8
x – Division champion/co-champions; ^ – NCAA Division I-AA playoff participant; Rankings from The Sports Network poll

The 2004 UMass Minutemen football team represented the University of Massachusetts Amherst in the 2004 NCAA Division I-AA football season as a member of the Atlantic 10 Conference. The team was coached by Don Brown and played its home games at Warren McGuirk Alumni Stadium in Hadley, Massachusetts. The Minutemen struggled in their first year under Coach Brown, but finished the season with a three-game winning streak and promise for the future. UMass finished second in the North division of the A-10 with a record of 6–5 (4–4 A-10).

== Schedule ==
Date	Time	Opponent	Rank	Site	TV	Result	Attendance	Source
September 4	1:00 p.m.	at Delaware State*	No. 19	Alumni Stadium; Dover, DE		W 51–0	1,750	
September 11	6:00 p.m.	No. 4 Colgate*	No. 14	McGuirk Stadium; Hadley, MA	CN8	W 30–20	16,405	
September 18	1:00 p.m.	Richmond	No. 9	McGuirk Stadium; Hadley, MA		L 14–24	4,986	
September 25	1:00 p.m.	No. 4 Delaware	No. 16	McGuirk Stadium; Hadley, MA	CSTV, CN8	L 7–21	11,298	
October 2	1:00 p.m.	at Boston College*	No. 19	Alumni Stadium; Chestnut Hill, MA (rivalry)	NESN	L 7–29	43,262	
October 9	1:30 p.m.	at No. 19 James Madison		Bridgeforth Stadium; Harrisonburg, VA		L 7–28	15,321	
October 16	12:00 p.m.	at New Hampshire		Cowell Stadium; Durham, NH (rivalry)		W 38–21	7,630	
October 23	12:00 p.m.	at Rhode Island		Meade Stadium; Kingston, RI		L 27–24	4,376	
October 30	1:00 p.m.	No. 19 Maine^{†}		McGuirk Stadium; Hadley, MA		W 35–34 ^{OT}	5,632	
November 6	12:00 p.m.	at Northeastern		Parsons Field; Brookline, MA	CN8	W 26–22	4,216	
November 20	12:00 p.m.	Hofstra		McGuirk Stadium; Hadley, MA	MetroTV New York	W 40-30	5,867	
*Non-conference game; ^{†}Homecoming; Rankings from The Sports Network Poll released prior to the game; All times are in Eastern time
