= 2004 La Salle Explorers football team =

American college football season

2004 La Salle Explorers football
- Conference: Metro Atlantic Athletic Conference
- Record: 3–7 (1–3 MAAC)
- Head coach: Phil Longo (1st season)
- Home stadium: McCarthy Stadium

2004 Metro Atlantic Athletic Conference football standings
	Conf.			Overall
Team	W		L	W		L
Duquesne $	4	–	0	7	–	3
Marist	3	–	1	3	–	6
La Salle	1	–	3	3	–	7
Saint Peter's	1	–	3	3	–	7
Iona	1	–	3	2	–	8
$ – Conference champion

The 2004 La Salle Explorers football team was an American football team that represented La Salle University of Philadelphia as a member of the Metro Atlantic Athletic Conference (MAAC) during the 2004 NCAA Division I-AA football season. In their first year under head coach Phil Longo, the Explorers compiled a 3–7 record (1–3 against conference opponents, tied for last place in the MAAC, and were outscored by a total of 327 to 297.

== Schedule ==
Date	Opponent	Site	Result	Attendance	Source
September 4	Wagner*	McCarthy Stadium; Philadelphia, PA	L 28–35	1,863	
September 11	at Monmouth*	Kessler Field; West Long Branch, NJ	L 15–34	3,277	
September 18	TCNJ*	McCarthy Stadium; Philadelphia, PA	L 0–6	1,201	
September 23	at Saint Peter's	Cochrane Stadium; Jersey City, NJ	W 30–27		
October 2	at Saint Francis (PA)*	Pine Bowl; Loretto, PA	L 42–45	940	
October 9	at Ursinus*	Patterson Field; Collegeville, PA	W 21–19	800	
October 16	Catholic University*	McCarthy Stadium; Philadelphia, PA	W 56–22	3,011	
October 23	Marist	McCarthy Stadium; Philadelphia, PA	L 35–41		
October 30	at Iona	Mazzella Field; New Rochelle, NY	L 35–42		
November 6	Duquesne	McCarthy Stadium; Philadelphia, PA	L 35–56		
*Non-conference game
