= 2004 Towson Tigers football team =

American college football season

2004 Towson Tigers football
- Conference: Atlantic 10 Conference
- South Division
- Record: 3–8 (0–8 A-10)
- Head coach: Gordy Combs (13th season)
- Home stadium: Johnny Unitas Stadium

2004 Atlantic 10 Conference football standings
	Conf.			Overall
Team	W		L	W		L
North Division
No. 6 New Hampshire x^	6	–	2	11	–	3
UMass	4	–	4	6	–	5
Northeastern	4	–	4	5	–	6
Hofstra	3	–	5	5	–	6
Maine	3	–	5	5	–	6
Rhode Island	2	–	6	4	–	7
South Division
No. 1 James Madison x^	7	–	1	13	–	2
No. 3 William & Mary x^	7	–	1	11	–	3
No. 7 Delaware x^	7	–	1	9	–	4
Villanova	3	–	5	6	–	5
Richmond	2	–	6	3	–	8
Towson	0	–	8	3	–	8
x – Division champion/co-champions; ^ – NCAA Division I-AA playoff participant; Rankings from The Sports Network poll

The 2004 Towson Tigers football team represented Towson University as a member of the Atlantic 10 Conference (A-10) during the 2004 NCAA Division I-AA football season. Led by 13th-year head coach Gordy Combs, the Tigers compiled an overall record of 3–8 with a mark of 0–8 in conference play, placing in last in the A-10's South Division. The team played home games at Johnny Unitas Stadium in Towson, Maryland.

== Schedule ==
Date	Time	Opponent	Rank	Site	Result	Attendance	Source
September 4	2:00 p.m.	at Elon*		Rhodes Stadium; Elon, NC	W 34–13	5,436	
September 11	7:00 p.m.	at No. 7 Delaware		Delaware Stadium; Newark, DE	L 17–21	22,782	
September 25	6:00 p.m.	No. 18 Northeastern		Johnny Unitas Stadium; Towson, MD	L 3–27	4,322	
October 2	1:00 p.m.	Cornell*		Johnny Unitas Stadium; Towson, MD	W 21–11	2,522	
October 9	6:00 p.m.	Rhode Island^{†}		Johnny Unitas Stadium; Towson, MD	L 16–28	7,102	
October 16	6:30 p.m.	Bowie State*		Johnny Unitas Stadium; Towson, MD	W 41–7	2,042	
October 23	3:00 p.m.	at No. 24 Villanova		Villanova Stadium; Villanova, PA	L 6–41	7,417	
October 30	6:00 p.m.	No. 16 William & Mary		Johnny Unitas Stadium; Towson, MD	L 16–41	3,280	
November 6	1:00 p.m.	at Richmond		University of Richmond Stadium; Richmond, VA	L 0–24	4,427	
November 13	12:00 p.m.	at No. 7 New Hampshire		Cowell Stadium; Durham, NH	L 24–62	3,304	
November 20	1:00 p.m.	No. 9 James Madison		Johnny Unitas Stadium; Towson, MD	L 17–31	2,744	
*Non-conference game; ^{†}Homecoming; Rankings from The Sports Network Poll released prior to the game; All times are in Eastern time
