= 2004 Rhode Island Rams football team =

American college football season

2004 Rhode Island Rams football
- Conference: Atlantic 10 Conference
- North Division
- Record: 4–7 (2–6 A-10)
- Head coach: Tim Stowers (5th season)
- Offensive coordinator: Harold Nichols (5th season)
- Defensive coordinator: Jeff McInerney (1st season)
- Home stadium: Meade Stadium

2004 Atlantic 10 Conference football standings
	Conf.			Overall
Team	W		L	W		L
North Division
No. 6 New Hampshire x^	6	–	2	11	–	3
UMass	4	–	4	6	–	5
Northeastern	4	–	4	5	–	6
Hofstra	3	–	5	5	–	6
Maine	3	–	5	5	–	6
Rhode Island	2	–	6	4	–	7
South Division
No. 1 James Madison x^	7	–	1	13	–	2
No. 3 William & Mary x^	7	–	1	11	–	3
No. 7 Delaware x^	7	–	1	9	–	4
Villanova	3	–	5	6	–	5
Richmond	2	–	6	3	–	8
Towson	0	–	8	3	–	8
x – Division champion/co-champions; ^ – NCAA Division I-AA playoff participant; Rankings from The Sports Network poll

The 2004 Rhode Island Rams football team was an American football team that represented the University of Rhode Island in the Atlantic 10 Conference during the 2004 NCAA Division I-AA football season. In their fifth season under head coach Tim Stowers, the Rams compiled a 4–7 record (2–6 against conference opponents) and finished fourth in the North Division of the Atlantic 10 Conference.

== Schedule ==
Date	Opponent	Site	Result	Attendance	Source
September 4	at Fordham	Coffey Field; Bronx, NY	W 37–36	4,460	
September 11	Central Connecticut*	Meade Stadium; Kingston, RI	W 39–7	2,865	
September 25	at Hofstra	James M. Shuart Stadium; Hempstead, NY	L 43–62	5,180	
October 2	Brown*	Meade Stadium; Kingston, RI (rivalry)	L 13–20	3,551	
October 9	Towson	Meade Stadium; Kingston, RI	W 28–16	7,102	
October 16	at No. 16 William & Mary	Zable Stadium; Williamsburg, VA	L 24–31	8,774	
October 23	UMass^{†}	Meade Stadium; Kingston, RI	W 27–24	4,376	
October 30	No. 23 Villanova	Meade Stadium; Kingston, RI	L 9–48	2,236	
November 6	No. 8 New Hampshire	Meade Stadium; Kingston, RI	L 3–27	4,595	
November 14	Maine	Meade Stadium; Kingston, RI	L 28–42	2,068	
November 20	at Northeastern	Parsons Field; Brookline, MA	L 14–42	2,672	
*Non-conference game; ^{†}Homecoming; Rankings from The Sports Network Poll released prior to the game
