= 2004 Robert Morris Colonials football team =

American college football season

2004 Robert Morris Colonials football
- Conference: Northeast Conference
- Record: 6–5 (3–4 NEC)
- Head coach: Joe Walton (11th season)
- Defensive coordinator: Dan Radakovich (10th season)
- Home stadium: Moon Stadium

2004 Northeast Conference football standings
	Conf.			Overall
Team	W		L	W		L
Monmouth +	6	–	1	10	–	1
Central Connecticut State +	6	–	1	8	–	2
Albany	4	–	3	4	–	7
Sacred Heart	3	–	4	6	–	4
Robert Morris	3	–	4	6	–	5
Wagner	3	–	4	6	–	5
Stony Brook	2	–	5	3	–	7
Saint Francis (PA)	1	–	6	3	–	8
+ – Conference co-champions

The 2004 Robert Morris Colonials football team represented Robert Morris University as a member of the Northeast Conference (NEC) during the 2004 NCAA Division I-AA football season. The Colonials were led by 11th-year head coach Joe Walton and played their home games at Moon Stadium on the campus of Moon Area High School.

== Schedule ==
Date	Time	Opponent	Site	Result	Attendance
September 4	1:30 p.m.	Buffalo State*	Moon Stadium; Moon Township, PA	W 47–10	1,168
September 11	1:30 p.m.	Duquesne*	Moon Stadium; Moon Township, PA	W 34–14	4,152
September 18	1:30 p.m.	Monmouth	Moon Stadium; Moon Township, PA	L 27–29	1,034
September 25	1:00 p.m.	at Saint Francis (PA)	Pine Bowl; Loretto, PA	W 28–10	910
October 2	12:30 p.m.	at Stony Brook	LaValle Stadium; Stony Brook, NY	W 31–24	5,740
October 9	1:30 p.m.	Central Connecticut State	Moon Stadium; Moon Township, PA	L 21–34	1,872
October 16	1:30 p.m.	Dayton*	Moon Stadium; Moon Township, PA	L 12–29	1,573
October 23	1:00 p.m.	at Wagner	Wagner College Stadium; Staten Island, NY	L 17–20	2,211
October 30	1:30 p.m.	Saint Peter's*	Moon Stadium; Moon Township, PA	W 23–12	1,019
November 6	1:30 p.m.	Albany	Moon Stadium; Moon Township, PA	W 34–7	1,024
November 13	1:00 p.m.	at Sacred Heart	Campus Field; Loretto, PA	L 3–24	1,662
*Non-conference game; All times are in Eastern time
