= 2004 Villanova Wildcats football team =

American college football season

2004 Villanova Wildcats football
- Conference: Atlantic 10 Conference
- South Division
- Record: 6–5 (3–5 A-10)
- Head coach: Andy Talley (20th season)
- Offensive coordinator: Sam Venuto (6th season)
- Offensive scheme: Multiple spread
- Defensive coordinator: Joe Trainer (8th season)
- Base defense: 4–3
- Home stadium: Villanova Stadium

2004 Atlantic 10 Conference football standings
	Conf.			Overall
Team	W		L	W		L
North Division
No. 6 New Hampshire x^	6	–	2	11	–	3
UMass	4	–	4	6	–	5
Northeastern	4	–	4	5	–	6
Hofstra	3	–	5	5	–	6
Maine	3	–	5	5	–	6
Rhode Island	2	–	6	4	–	7
South Division
No. 1 James Madison x^	7	–	1	13	–	2
No. 3 William & Mary x^	7	–	1	11	–	3
No. 7 Delaware x^	7	–	1	9	–	4
Villanova	3	–	5	6	–	5
Richmond	2	–	6	3	–	8
Towson	0	–	8	3	–	8
x – Division champion/co-champions; ^ – NCAA Division I-AA playoff participant; Rankings from The Sports Network poll

The 2004 Villanova Wildcats football team represented Villanova University in the 2004 NCAA Division I-AA football season as a member of the Atlantic 10 Conference (A-10). The Wildcats were led by 20th-year head coach Andy Talley and played their home games at Villanova Stadium. They finished the season with an overall record of six wins and five losses (6–5, 3–5 in the A-10).

== Schedule ==
Date	Time	Opponent	Rank	Site	TV	Result	Attendance
September 2	7:00 pm	Bucknell*	No. 9	Villanova Stadium; Villanova, PA		W 20–14	9,073
September 11	1:00 pm	at No. 22 Lehigh*	No. 8	Goodman Stadium; Bethlehem, PA	FSNP	W 22–16	12,235
September 18	1:00 pm	James Madison	No. 5	Villanova Stadium; Villanova, PA		L 0–17	3,123
September 25	7:00 pm	at No. 22 Penn*	No. 11	Franklin Field; Philadelphia, PA	CN8	W 16–13	16,572
October 2	6:00 pm	No. 12 New Hampshire	No. 10	Villanova Stadium; Villanova, PA	CN8	L 40–51	7,119
October 9	12:30 pm	at No. 23 Northeastern	No. 14	Parsons Field; Brookline, MA		L 30–34	4,126
October 16	1:00 pm	Richmond	No. 24	Villanova Stadium; Villanova, PA		W 49–10	5,621
October 23	3:00 pm	Towson*	No. 24	Villanova Stadium; Villanova, PA		W 41–6	7,417
October 30	12:00 pm	at Rhode Island	No. 23	Meade Stadium; Kingston, RI		W 48–9	2,236
November 6	1:00 pm	at No. 13 William & Mary	No. 19	Zable Stadium; Williamsburg, VA		L 29–37	6,755
November 20	1:00 pm	at No. 11 Delaware		Delaware Stadium; Newark, DE (rivalry)	CN8	L 35–41	22,045
*Non-conference game; Rankings from The Sports Network Poll released prior to the game; All times are in Eastern time
