= Patrick Graham (American football) =

American football player and coach (born 1979)

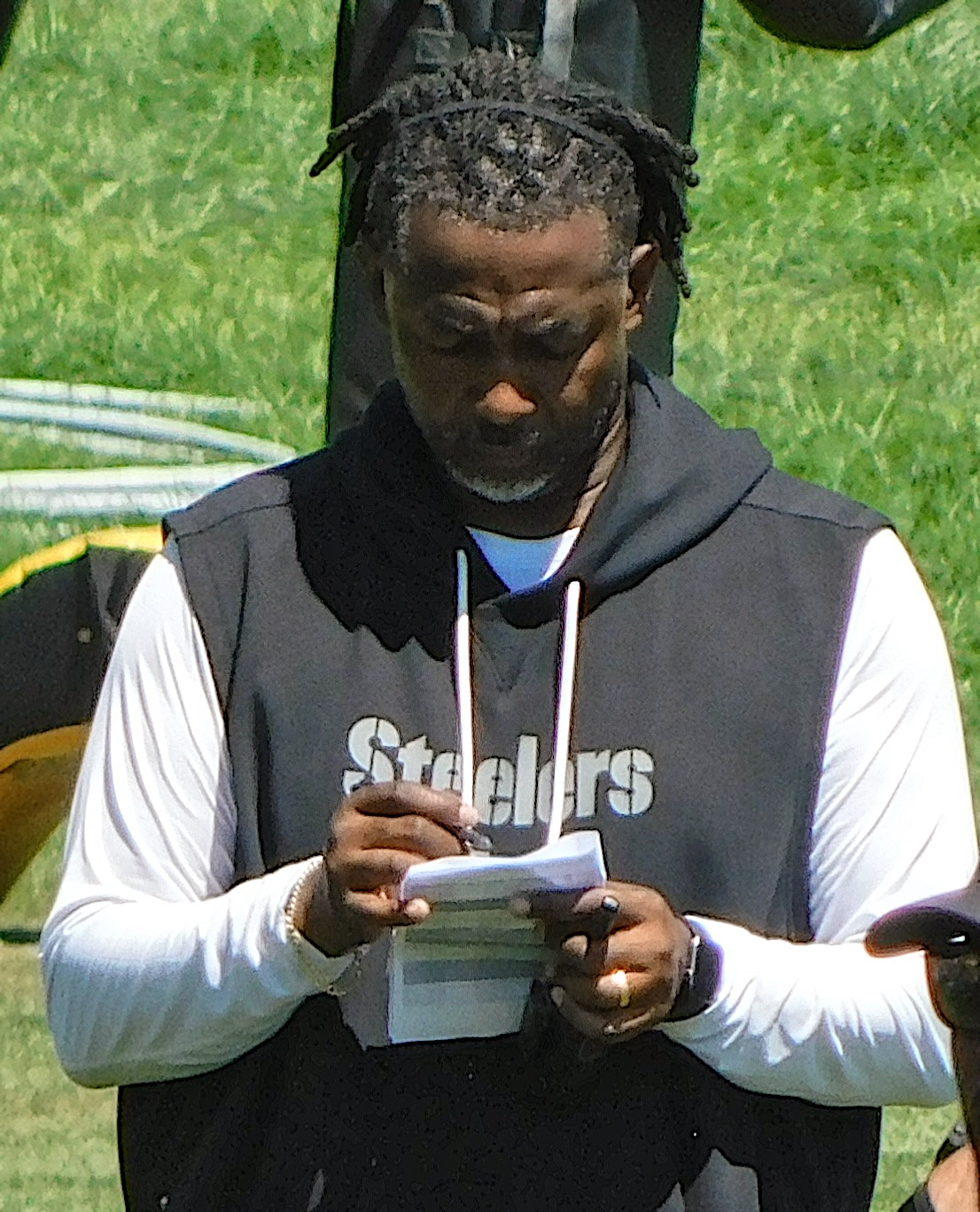
- Graham with the Pittsburgh Steelers in 2026

Pittsburgh Steelers
- Title: Defensive coordinator

Personal information
- Born: January 24, 1979 (age 47); Des Plaines, Illinois, U.S.

Career information
- Position: Defensive lineman
- College: Yale
- NFL draft: 2001: undrafted

Career history
- Wagner (2002–2003) Graduate assistant; Richmond (2004–2006); Defensive line coach (2004); Tight ends coach (2005–2006); Notre Dame (2007–2008) Graduate assistant; Toledo (2009) Defensive line coach; New England Patriots (2009–2015); Coaching assistant (2009); Defensive assistant (2010); Linebackers coach (2011); Defensive line coach (2012–2013); Linebackers coach (2014–2015); New York Giants (2016–2017) Defensive line coach; Green Bay Packers (2018) Linebackers coach & run game coordinator; Miami Dolphins (2019) Defensive coordinator; New York Giants (2020–2021) Assistant head coach & defensive coordinator; Las Vegas Raiders (2022–2025) Defensive coordinator; Pittsburgh Steelers (2026–present) Defensive coordinator

Awards and highlights
- Super Bowl champion (XLIX)
- Coaching profile at Pro Football Reference

Patrick Graham (born January 24, 1979) is an American professional football coach and former player who is currently the defensive coordinator for the Pittsburgh Steelers of the National Football League (NFL). He previously served as defensive coordinator for the Las Vegas Raiders, New York Giants, and Miami Dolphins as well as an inside linebackers coach for the Green Bay Packers and assistant coach for the New England Patriots.

== College career ==
Graham played college football as a defensive lineman at Yale University, graduating with a bachelor's degree in sociology in 2002.

== Coaching career ==
=== College ===
Following his college football career, Graham worked as a graduate assistant at Wagner College while also studying for his MBA. After two seasons at Wagner, Graham moved to the University of Richmond, where he was the defensive line coach in 2004 and then a tight ends coach in 2005 and 2006. In 2007, he was a defensive graduate assistant under head coach Charlie Weis at the University of Notre Dame. Following the 2008 season, Graham accepted the position as the team's defensive line coach at the University of Toledo. He resigned after one month.

=== New England Patriots ===
In February 2009 Graham joined the New England Patriots as a defensive coaching assistant, where Weis had formerly been an assistant coach under head coach Bill Belichick. In 2010, Graham's title was changed to defensive assistant coach. He was promoted to linebackers coach in 2011. In 2012, he moved to defensive line coach, and moved back to linebackers in 2014. He won his first Super Bowl title when the Patriots defeated the Seattle Seahawks in Super Bowl XLIX.

=== New York Giants (first stint) ===
In 2016, Graham was hired by the New York Giants as the team's defensive line coach.

=== Green Bay Packers ===
In 2018, Graham was hired by the Green Bay Packers to be their run game coordinator.

=== Miami Dolphins ===
On February 8, 2019, the Miami Dolphins announced Graham as their defensive coordinator. reuniting with former Patriots coach Brian Flores.

=== New York Giants (second stint) ===
On January 17, 2020, Graham returned to the New York Giants and was hired as their assistant head coach and defensive coordinator under head coach Joe Judge whom he had worked with in the Patriots organization from 2012 to 2018.

=== Las Vegas Raiders ===
After originally being announced as being retained by Brian Daboll, on February 4, 2022, Graham was hired by the Las Vegas Raiders as defensive coordinator under new head coach Josh McDaniels. Graham previously worked alongside McDaniels on the New England Patriots from 2012 to 2015. On February 1, 2024, the Raiders announced Graham would be retained under new head coach Antonio Pierce. On January 31, 2025, the Raiders announced Graham would be retained under new head coach Pete Carroll.

=== Pittsburgh Steelers ===
On January 30, 2026, the Pittsburgh Steelers hired Graham as their new defensive coordinator under head coach Mike McCarthy. Graham had previously been McCarthy's linebackers coach and defensive run game coordinator in Green Bay during the 2018 season.

== Personal life ==
Graham is married to Pamela Best, and they have two children, Morgan and Silas.
