= 2004 Wagner Seahawks football team =

American college football season

2004 Wagner Seahawks football
- Conference: Northeast Conference
- Record: 6–5 (3–4 NEC)
- Head coach: Walt Hameline (24th season)
- Offensive coordinator: Jeremy Cameron (1st season)
- Defensive coordinator: Adam Fuller (1st season)
- Home stadium: Wagner College Stadium

2004 Northeast Conference football standings
	Conf.			Overall
Team	W		L	W		L
Monmouth +	6	–	1	10	–	1
Central Connecticut State +	6	–	1	8	–	2
Albany	4	–	3	4	–	7
Sacred Heart	3	–	4	6	–	4
Robert Morris	3	–	4	6	–	5
Wagner	3	–	4	6	–	5
Stony Brook	2	–	5	3	–	7
Saint Francis (PA)	1	–	6	3	–	8
+ – Conference co-champions

The 2004 Wagner Seahawks football team represented Wagner College in the 2004 NCAA Division I-AA football season as a member of the Northeast Conference (NEC). The Seahawks were led by 24th-year head coach Walt Hameline and played their home games at Wagner College Stadium. Wagner finished the season 6–5 overall and 3–4 in NEC play to place in a three-way tie for fourth place.

== Schedule ==
Date	Time	Opponent	Site	Result	Attendance	Source
September 4	1:00 p.m.	at La Salle*	McCarthy Stadium; Philadelphia, PA	W 35–28	1,863	
September 11	1:00 p.m.	at Marist*	Leonidoff Field; Poughkeepsie, NY	W 28–13	1,309	
September 18	1:00 p.m.	Stony Brook	Wagner College Stadium; Staten Island, NY	W 21–13	1,309	
September 25	6:00 p.m.	at Central Connecticut	Arute Field; New Britain, CT	L 21–28 ^{OT}	2,967	
October 2	1:00 p.m.	at Sacred Heart	Campus Field; Fairfield, CT	W 24–30 ^{OT}	1,844	
October 9	1:00 p.m.	Monmouth	Wagner College Stadium; Staten Island, NY	L 7–14	2,480	
October 16	1:00 p.m.	Iona*	Wagner College Stadium; Staten Island, NY	W 27–14	1,025	
October 23	1:00 p.m.	Robert Morris	Wagner College Stadium; Staten Island, NY	W 20–17	3,143	
October 30	1:00 p.m.	at Albany	University Field; Albany, NY	L 27–35	1,011	
November 6	1:00 p.m.	at Saint Francis (PA)	Pine Bowl; Loretto, PA	W 17–14	1,045	
November 13	4:30 p.m.	at San Diego*	Torero Stadium; San Diego, CA	L 14–35	5,372	
*Non-conference game; All times are in Eastern time
