= 2004 Monmouth Hawks football team =

American college football season

2004 Monmouth Hawks football

Consensus Mid-Major Champion NEC co-champion
- Conference: Northeast Conference
- Record: 10–1 (6–1 NEC)
- Head coach: Kevin Callahan (12th season)
- Offensive coordinator: Mark Fabish (3rd season)
- Offensive scheme: Pro-style
- Defensive coordinator: Andy Bobik (11th season)
- Base defense: 4–3
- Home stadium: Kessler Field

2004 Northeast Conference football standings
	Conf.			Overall
Team	W		L	W		L
Monmouth +	6	–	1	10	–	1
Central Connecticut State +	6	–	1	8	–	2
Albany	4	–	3	4	–	7
Sacred Heart	3	–	4	6	–	4
Robert Morris	3	–	4	6	–	5
Wagner	3	–	4	6	–	5
Stony Brook	2	–	5	3	–	7
Saint Francis (PA)	1	–	6	3	–	8
+ – Conference co-champions

The 2004 Monmouth Hawks football team represented Monmouth University in the 2004 NCAA Division I-AA football season as a member of the Northeast Conference (NEC). The Hawks were led by 12th-year head coach Kevin Callahan and played their home games at Kessler Field. They finished the season 10–1 overall and 6–1 in NEC play to share the conference championship with Central Connecticut State. Despite their regular season success, the Hawks did not receive an invitation to participate in the NCAA Division I-AA postseason.

== Schedule ==
Date	Time	Opponent	Site	Result	Attendance
September 4	7:00 p.m.	at Saint Peter's*	Cochrane Stadium; Jersey City, NJ	W 44–3	3,220
September 11	1:00 p.m.	La Salle*	Kessler Field; West Long Branch, NJ	W 34–15	3,277
September 18	1:30 p.m.	at Robert Morris	Moon Stadium; Moon Township, PA	W 29–27	1,034
September 25	1:00 p.m.	Stony Brook	Kessler Field; West Long Branch, NJ	L 0–27	3,356
October 2	1:00 p.m.	at Iona*	Mazzella Field; New Rochelle, NY	W 40–14	1,334
October 9	1:00 p.m.	at Wagner	Wagner College Stadium; Staten Island, NY	W 14–7	2,480
October 16	1:00 p.m.	at Albany	University Field; Albany, NY	W 25–24	1,421
October 23	1:00 p.m.	Georgetown*	Kessler Field; West Long Branch, NJ	W 27–10	3,687
October 30	1:00 p.m.	Central Connecticut State	Kessler Field; West Long Branch, NJ	W 9–6	3,743
November 6	1:00 p.m.	Sacred Heart	Kessler Field; West Long Branch, NJ	W 28–10	2,421
November 13	1:00 p.m.	Saint Francis (PA)	Kessler Field; West Long Branch, NJ	W 49–39	1,889
*Non-conference game; All times are in Eastern time
