= 2004 Stony Brook Seawolves football team =

American college football season

2004 Stony Brook Seawolves football
- Conference: Northeast Conference
- Record: 3–7 (2–5 NEC)
- Head coach: Sam Kornhauser (21st season)
- Offensive coordinator: Paul McGonagle (1st season)
- Defensive coordinator: Vince Sinagra (1st season)
- Home stadium: Kenneth P. LaValle Stadium

2004 Northeast Conference football standings
	Conf.			Overall
Team	W		L	W		L
Monmouth +	6	–	1	10	–	1
Central Connecticut State +	6	–	1	8	–	2
Albany	4	–	3	4	–	7
Sacred Heart	3	–	4	6	–	4
Robert Morris	3	–	4	6	–	5
Wagner	3	–	4	6	–	5
Stony Brook	2	–	5	3	–	7
Saint Francis (PA)	1	–	6	3	–	8
+ – Conference co-champions

The 2004 Stony Brook Seawolves football team represented Stony Brook University as a member of the Northeast Conference (NEC) during the 2004 NCAA Division I-AA football season. Led by 21st-year head coach Sam Kornhauser, the Seawolves compiled an overall record of 3–7 with a mark of 2–5 in conference place, placing seventh in the NEC. Stony Brook played home games at Kenneth P. LaValle Stadium in Stony Brook, New York.

== Schedule ==
Date	Time	Opponent	Site	Result	Attendance	Source
September 4	1:00 p.m.	at No. 23 Lehigh*	Goodman Stadium; Bethlehem, PA	L 2–25	7,116	
September 18	1:00 p.m.	at Wagner	Wagner College Stadium; Staten Island, NY	L 13–21	1,309	
September 25	1:00 p.m.	at Monmouth	Kessler Field; West Long Branch, NJ	W 27–0	3,356	
October 2	12:30 p.m.	Robert Morris^{†}	Kenneth P. LaValle Stadium; Stony Brook, NY	L 24–31	5,740	
October 9	6:00 p.m.	Hofstra*	Kenneth P. LaValle Stadium; Stony Brook, NY (Battle of Long Island)	L 21–61	4,650	
October 16	1:00 p.m.	at St. Francis (PA)	DeGol Field; Loretto, PA	W 29–21	534	
October 23	6:00 p.m.	Albany	Kenneth P. LaValle Stadium; Stony Brook, NY (rivalry)	L 22–27	3,572	
October 30	6:00 p.m.	Sacred Heart	Kenneth P. LaValle Stadium; Stony Brook, NY	L 35–38	1,572	
November 6	1:00 p.m.	at Central Connecticut State	Arute Field; New Britain, CT	L 28–38	2,995	
November 13	4:00 p.m.	Iona*	Kenneth P. LaValle Stadium; Stony Brook, NY	W 45–13	1,350	
*Non-conference game; ^{†}Homecoming; Rankings from Coaches' Poll released prior to the game; All times are in Eastern time
