= 2004 New Hampshire Wildcats football team =

American college football season

2004 New Hampshire Wildcats football

A-10 North Division champion

NCAA Division I-AA Quarterfinal, L 17–37 at Montana
- Conference: Atlantic 10 Conference
- North Division

Ranking
- Sports Network: No. 6
- Record: 10–3 (6–2 A-10)
- Head coach: Sean McDonnell (6th season)
- Offensive coordinator: Chip Kelly (6th season)
- Home stadium: Cowell Stadium

2004 Atlantic 10 Conference football standings
	Conf.			Overall
Team	W		L	W		L
North Division
No. 6 New Hampshire x^	6	–	2	11	–	3
UMass	4	–	4	6	–	5
Northeastern	4	–	4	5	–	6
Hofstra	3	–	5	5	–	6
Maine	3	–	5	5	–	6
Rhode Island	2	–	6	4	–	7
South Division
No. 1 James Madison x^	7	–	1	13	–	2
No. 3 William & Mary x^	7	–	1	11	–	3
No. 7 Delaware x^	7	–	1	9	–	4
Villanova	3	–	5	6	–	5
Richmond	2	–	6	3	–	8
Towson	0	–	8	3	–	8
x – Division champion/co-champions; ^ – NCAA Division I-AA playoff participant; Rankings from The Sports Network poll

The 2004 New Hampshire Wildcats football team was an American football team that represented the University of New Hampshire as a member of the Atlantic 10 Conference during the 2004 NCAA Division I-AA football season. In its sixth year under head coach Sean McDonnell, the team compiled a 10–3 record (6–2 against conference opponents), finished fourth out of twelve teams in the Atlantic 10 Conference, and lost to Montana in the quarterfinal of the NCAA Division I-AA Football Championship playoffs.

== Schedule ==
Date	Opponent	Rank	Site	Result	Attendance	Source
September 2	at No. 1 Delaware*		Delaware Stadium; Newark, DE	W 24–21	22,727	
September 11	at Rutgers*	No. 19	Rutgers Stadium; Piscataway, NJ	W 35–24	31,615	
September 18	William & Mary	No. 10	Cowell Stadium; Durham, NH	L 7–9	3,512	
September 25	at Dartmouth*	No. 14	Memorial Field; Hanover, NH (rivalry)	W 45–24	4,925	
October 2	at No. 10 Villanova	No. 12	Villanova Stadium; Villanova, PA	W 51–40	7,119	
October 16	UMass	No. 7	Cowell Stadium; Durham, NH (rivalry)	L 21–38	7,630	
October 23	Hofstra	No. 15	Cowell Stadium; Durham, NH	W 33–27	5,203	
October 30	at Northeastern	No. 10	Brookline, MA	W 27–23	3,438	
November 6	at Rhode Island	No. 8	Meade Stadium; Kingston, RI	W 27–3	4,595	
November 13	Towson	No. 7	Cowell Stadium; Durham, NH	W 62–24	3,304	
November 20	at Maine	No. 5	Alfond Stadium; Orono, ME (Battle for the Brice–Cowell Musket)	W 50–36	4,301	
November 27	at No. 4 Georgia Southern*	No. 5	Paulson Stadium; Statesboro, GA (NCAA Division I-AA First Round)	W 27–23	6,053	
December 4	at No. 7 Montana*	No. 5	Washington–Grizzly Stadium; Missoula, MT (NCAA Division I-AA Quarterfinal)	L 17–47	20,919	
*Non-conference game; Rankings from The Sports Network Poll released prior to the game
