= Craig Ochs =

American football player (born 1981)

Profile
- Position: Quarterback

Personal information
- Born: August 20, 1981 (age 45); Colorado Springs, Colorado, U.S.
- Listed height: 6 ft 2 in (1.88 m)
- Listed weight: 210 lb (95 kg)

Career information
- College: Montana
- NFL draft: 2005: undrafted

Career history
- San Diego Chargers (2005)*; Frankfurt Galaxy (2006); Buffalo Bills (2006)
- * Offseason or practice squad member only

Craig Ochs (born August 20, 1981) is an American former football quarterback for the San Diego Chargers and Buffalo Bills in the National Football League (NFL) and was also assigned to the Frankfurt Galaxy of NFL Europe in the 2006 season.

== Biography ==
Ochs played high school football at Fairview High School in Boulder, Colorado, where he earned All-American honors. He began his college football career with the Colorado Buffaloes in 2000. At the time, Ochs was considered one of the top young quarterbacks in Division I. After he was sidelined due to a string of concussions, Ochs decided to transfer to the University of Montana and play for the Division I-AA Montana Grizzlies. In his senior season of 2004, Ochs rated among the top I-AA quarterbacks and led the Grizzlies to the national title game.

Going into 2005, Ochs was tabbed as a borderline draft pick. He went undrafted, however, in the 2005 NFL draft. Ochs signed on to play with the San Diego Chargers soon after the draft but was cut on August 25, 2005, before the regular season began. Ochs tried out with the Buffalo Bills during the NFL regular season but did not get an offer to sign with the team. He was also sought out by the Winnipeg Blue Bombers of the CFL, but held out for another NFL opportunity.

Eventually, Buffalo offered Ochs a two-year contract after the season ended on January 9, 2006, as the team's third-string quarterback. The Bills allocated Ochs to the Frankfurt Galaxy in NFL Europa on January 19, 2006. On April 22, 2006, he got his first start for the Galaxy, leading Frankfurt to an 18–17 comeback win over the Berlin Thunder. Ochs led Frankfurt to a 7–3 record and a World Bowl title in 2006.

Ochs suffered an injury in May 2006 and became a coach on offense for the University of Montana. He would later return to Colorado to attend a masters-through-law program at the University of Denver, with a focus on the natural resource law, after which he took up work in work with Acorn Petroleum—an oil and gas distribution company, which had been founded by his grand-father and great uncle—in Colorado Springs.

== College stats ==
Passing Stats
Year	Team	G	Passing Att.-Comp.	Yards	Avg.	TD	Int.	Int Avg. %	Pass Rating
2000	Colorado	8	245-145	1,778	7.2	7	7	0	123.8
2001	Colorado	7	166-99	1,220	7.3	7	6	0	128.0
2002	Colorado	2	0	327	7.7	2	2	4.7	121.5
2003	Montana	9	204-121	1,612	7.9	9	8	3.9	132.4
2004	Montana	15	450-309	3,807	8.4	33	8	1.7	160.3
Totals		41	1,107-695	8,744	7.8	58	31	2.8	140.8

== Pro stats ==
Passing Stats
Year	Team	G	Passing Att.-Comp.	Yards	Avg.	TD	Int.	Int Avg. %	Pass Rating
2005	San Diego	0	0-0	0	0	0	0	0	0
2006	Frankfurt	8	142-84	1,019	7.18	6	4	2.8	83.6
2006	Buffalo	0	0-0	0	0	0	0	0	0
NFL Totals		0	0-0	0	0	0	0	0	0
