= Dominique Thompson =

American football player (born 1982)

No. 17
- Position: Wide receiver

Personal information
- Born: December 28, 1982 (age 43); Fort Polk, Louisiana, U.S.
- Listed height: 5 ft 11 in (1.80 m)
- Listed weight: 205 lb (93 kg)

Career information
- High school: Riverside (Durham, North Carolina)
- College: William & Mary
- NFL draft: 2005: undrafted

Career history
- St. Louis Rams (2005–2007); Carolina Panthers (2008)*; Florida Tuskers (2009)*; Philadelphia Soul (2011)
- * Offseason or practice squad member only

Awards and highlights
- Second-team I-AA All-American (2004)

Career NFL statistics
- Receptions: 1
- Receiving yards: 13
- Stats at Pro Football Reference

Career AFL statistics
- Receptions: 2
- Receiving yards: 28
- Receiving touchdowns: 1
- Stats at ArenaFan.com

Dominique Damar Thompson (born December 28, 1982) is an American former professional football player who was a wide receiver in the National Football League (NFL). He played college football for the William & Mary Tribe. Thompson was signed by the St. Louis Rams as an undrafted free agent in 2005.

Thompson was also a member of the Carolina Panthers and Florida Tuskers.

== Professional career ==
=== Florida Tuskers ===
On August 17, 2009, Thompson was signed by the Florida Tuskers of the United Football League.
