= 2004 Delaware Fightin' Blue Hens football team =

American college football season

2004 Delaware Fightin' Blue Hens football

Atlantic 10 South Division co-champion

NCAA Division I-AA Quarterfinal, L 38–44 vs. William & Mary
- Conference: Atlantic 10 Conference
- South Division

Ranking
- Sports Network: No. 7
- Record: 9–4 (7–1 A-10)
- Head coach: K. C. Keeler (3rd season)
- Offensive coordinator: Kirk Ciarrocca (3rd season)
- Offensive scheme: Spread
- Defensive coordinator: Dave Cohen (3rd season)
- Base defense: 4–3
- Home stadium: Delaware Stadium

2004 Atlantic 10 Conference football standings
	Conf.			Overall
Team	W		L	W		L
North Division
No. 6 New Hampshire x^	6	–	2	11	–	3
UMass	4	–	4	6	–	5
Northeastern	4	–	4	5	–	6
Hofstra	3	–	5	5	–	6
Maine	3	–	5	5	–	6
Rhode Island	2	–	6	4	–	7
South Division
No. 1 James Madison x^	7	–	1	13	–	2
No. 3 William & Mary x^	7	–	1	11	–	3
No. 7 Delaware x^	7	–	1	9	–	4
Villanova	3	–	5	6	–	5
Richmond	2	–	6	3	–	8
Towson	0	–	8	3	–	8
x – Division champion/co-champions; ^ – NCAA Division I-AA playoff participant; Rankings from The Sports Network poll

The 2004 Delaware Fightin' Blue Hens football team represented the University of Delaware as a member of the South Division of the Atlantic 10 Conference (A-10) during the 2004 NCAA Division I-AA football season. Led by third-year head coach K. C. Keeler, the Fightin' Blue Hens compiled an overall record of 9–4 with a mark of 7–1 in conference play, sharing the A-10 South Division title with James Madison and William & Mary. Delaware advanced to the NCAA Division I-AA Football Championship playoffs, where the Fightin' Blue Hens beat Lafayette in the first round before losing to William & Mary in the quarterfinals. The team played home games at Delaware Stadium in Newark, Delaware.

== Schedule ==
Date	Time	Opponent	Rank	Site	TV	Result	Attendance	Source
September 2	7:00 pm	New Hampshire*	No. 1	Delaware Stadium; Newark, DE		L 49–52	22,727	
September 11	7:00 pm	Towson	No. 7	Delaware Stadium; Newark, DE		W 21–17	22,782	
September 18	7:00 pm	West Chester*	No. 6	Delaware Stadium; Newark, DE (rivalry)		W 24–6	22,036	
September 25	1:00 pm	at No. 16 UMass	No. 4	Warren McGuirk Alumni Stadium; Amherst, MA	CN8	W 21–7	11,298	
October 2	12:00 pm	No. 8 Maine^{†}	No. 4	Delaware Stadium; Newark, DE	CSN	W 43–38	22,030	
October 16	1:30 pm	at Hofstra	No. 3	James M. Shuart Stadium; Hempstead, NY		W 20–19	7,050	
October 23	1:00 pm	No. 14 William & Mary	No. 3	Delaware Stadium; Newark, DE (rivalry)		W 31–28	22,058	
October 30	1:30 pm	at Navy*	No. 3	Navy–Marine Corps Memorial Stadium; Annapolis, MD	CN8	L 20–34	34,416	
November 6	1:30 pm	at No. 7 James Madison	No. 6	Bridgeforth Stadium; Harrisonburg, VA (rivalry)		L 13–20	12,683	
November 13	1:00 pm	at Richmond	No. 11	University of Richmond Stadium; Richmond, VA		W 23–14	5,028	
November 20	1:00 pm	Villanova	No. 11	Delaware Stadium; Newark, DE (Battle of the Blue)	CN8	W 41–35	22,045	
November 27	3:00 pm	No. 25 Lafayette*	No. 10	Delaware Stadium; Newark, DE (NCAA Division I-AA First Round)	CSTV	W 28–14	13,707	
December 4	12:00 pm	at No. 6 William & Mary*	No. 10	Zable Stadium; Williamsburg, VA (NCAA Division I-AA Quarterfinal)	ESPNGP	L 38–44 ^{2OT}	8,875	
*Non-conference game; ^{†}Homecoming; Rankings from The Sports Network Poll released prior to the game; All times are in Eastern time
