= Lang Campbell =

American football player (born 1981)

No. 12
- Position: Quarterback

Personal information
- Born: September 25, 1981 (age 45); Winchester, Virginia, U.S.
- Listed height: 6 ft 2 in (1.88 m)
- Listed weight: 210 lb (95 kg)

Career information
- High school: Winchester (VA) John Handley
- College: William & Mary
- NFL draft: 2005: undrafted

Career history
- Cleveland Browns (2005–2006); Berlin Thunder (2006); Austin Wranglers (2007); Atlanta Falcons (2007)*; Arizona Cardinals (2007)*; Arizona Rattlers (2008)
- * Offseason or practice squad member only

Awards and highlights
- Walter Payton Award (2004)

Career AFL statistics
- Comp. / Att.: 311 / 481
- Passing yards: 3,720
- TD–INT: 74–18
- Passer rating: 111.06
- Rushing TD: 4
- Stats at ArenaFan.com

Lang Campbell (born September 25, 1981) is an American former professional football quarterback who played in the Arena Football League (AFL) and NFL Europe. He was signed by the Cleveland Browns as an undrafted free agent in 2005. He played college football for the William & Mary Tribe.

== Early life ==
Campbell attended John Handley High School in Winchester, Virginia and was a student and a letterman in football, baseball, and basketball. In football, he was a three-year letterman. In basketball, he lettered 3 years and was a two-time All-League selection. As a senior, he was named the Winchester Star Player of the Year. He was the first Handley athlete to be named to a first-team all state team in three sports, football, basketball, and baseball. Lang Campbell graduated from Handley High School in 2000.

Won a state title in Baseball in 1999 with a 25–1 record and as the team had a two-year run of 46–4 to finish his final two years of baseball.

== College career ==
Campbell was a two-year starter at The College of William and Mary. He broke out during his senior season, throwing for 3,988 yards and 30 touchdowns with just seven interceptions. He was named the 2004 Walter Payton Award winner (Best College Player), and 2004 Atlantic 10 Offensive Player-of-the-Day for the offseason, and helped lead William & Mary to a share of the Atlantic 10 title and its first appearance in the NCAA Division I-AA semifinals, along with the school's first 11-win season in the 111-year history of the program. Campbell threw for 6,494 passing yards during his career with 54 touchdowns.

== Professional career ==
Campbell was acquired by the Cleveland Browns on January 6, 2006, as a free agent. He was originally signed by the Browns on April 29, 2005, as an undrafted rookie free agent following the 2005 NFL draft, but was waived by the team on August 28, 2005. Campbell represented the Browns for the Berlin Thunder during the 2006 NFL Europe season.

Campbell started all 10 games of the 2006 season for the Berlin Thunder and led the team in passing with 1,264 yards, completing 116 of 204 attempts with 10 touchdowns and 4 interceptions. His totals in attempts and completions led the league. The Thunder compiled a 2–7–1 record in 2006, finishing sixth in the six-team league. The tie, a 17–17 draw on the road against the Hamburg Sea Devils on April 1, 2006, was one of only two ties to occur in the now-defunct NFL Europe (the league played its final season in 2007 under the moniker NFL Europa).

He returned to the Cleveland Browns for their 2006 training camp. During the preseason, he completed eight passes on 14 attempts for 75 yards. He added one touchdown and two interceptions to compile a 76.7 passer rating. The Browns released Campbell before the beginning of the 2006 NFL regular season. He was re-signed for the final regular season game against the Houston Texans, but did not play.

Campbell signed with the Austin Wranglers of the Arena Football League on March 2, 2007, as the backup for former Florida State University quarterback Adrian McPherson. When McPherson was abruptly released on May 7, 2007, Campbell became the de facto starter for the Wranglers. Through 10 games (6 starts), the AFL rookie has posted 1581 yards passing and 28 TDs (against 8 INTs) on 64.7% passing for a passer rating of 112.7, to go along with 3 rushing TDs. He earned his first win as a starter with an 82–54 victory over the New York Dragons, a game in which he threw for 8 TDs.

Campbell was added to the Arizona Cardinals practice squad in August 2007, but was cut early in the 2007 season. On October 26, 2007, the Arizona Rattlers (Arena Football) selected Campbell as their 1st pick in the dispersal draft.

== Business career ==
Lang has had a successful career in sales and business development since leaving the NFL. He spent six years at Morgan Stanley, where he rose to the position of Director of Business Strategy. He then worked as a benefits consultant at Corporate Synergies. Lang subsequently moved into technology sales, serving as an Account Executive at ThreatSwitch for one year before joining the software development firm 3Pillar Global.

In addition to his day-to-day work, Lang has served as a board member for Project Hope for the past 5 years.
