= 3Pillar Global =

American software company

3Pillar Global, Inc.
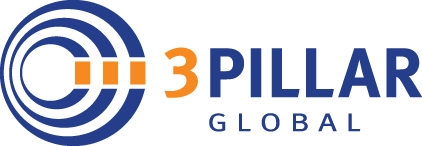
- Company type: Private
- Industry: Software development
- Founded: 2006; 20 years ago in Fairfax, Virginia
- Founder: David H. DeWolf
- Headquarters: Fairfax, Virginia, United States
- Website: 3pillarglobal.com

3Pillar Global, Inc. is a product lifecycle management and software product development company based in Virginia, United States.

== History ==
3Pillar Global was founded in 2006 as Three Pillar Global, Inc by David H. DeWolf. It is headquartered in Fairfax, Virginia and has offices in Timișoara, Iasi, Cluj-Napoca in Romania; and Noida, India.

== Services ==
The company offers services in eight core areas: product strategy, product management, UI and UX, product architecture, product engineering, quality assurance and testing, product operations, and project management.

Sectors served by the company include media and entertainment, financial services, information services, and the health and wellness industry. Notable clients include PBS, CARFAX, and Equinox Group. The company has more than 1500 employees worldwide.

== Acquisitions ==
In September 2022, 3Pillar Global announced the acquisition of Toronto–based software development company Jonah Group.

In August 2020, 3Pillar Global announced the acquisition of Costa Rica–based software development company Isthmus Software.

In December 2020, 3Pillar Global announced the acquisition of Tempe Arizona–based software development company Tiempo Development.
