= 2004 James Madison Dukes football team =

American college football season

2004 James Madison Dukes football

NCAA Division I-AA champion A-10 South Division co-champion Lambert Cup winner

NCAA Division I-AA Championship Game, W 31–21 vs. Montana
- Conference: Atlantic 10 Conference
- South Division

Ranking
- Sports Network: No. 1
- FCS Coaches: No. 1
- Record: 13–2 (7–1 A–10)
- Head coach: Mickey Matthews (6th season)
- Offensive coordinator: Jeff Durden (1st season)
- Defensive coordinator: George Barlow (1st season)
- Home stadium: Bridgeforth Stadium

2004 Atlantic 10 Conference football standings
	Conf.			Overall
Team	W		L	W		L
North Division
No. 6 New Hampshire x^	6	–	2	11	–	3
UMass	4	–	4	6	–	5
Northeastern	4	–	4	5	–	6
Hofstra	3	–	5	5	–	6
Maine	3	–	5	5	–	6
Rhode Island	2	–	6	4	–	7
South Division
No. 1 James Madison x^	7	–	1	13	–	2
No. 3 William & Mary x^	7	–	1	11	–	3
No. 7 Delaware x^	7	–	1	9	–	4
Villanova	3	–	5	6	–	5
Richmond	2	–	6	3	–	8
Towson	0	–	8	3	–	8
x – Division champion/co-champions; ^ – NCAA Division I-AA playoff participant; Rankings from The Sports Network poll

The 2004 James Madison Dukes football team represented James Madison University in the 2004 NCAA Division I-AA football season, and completed the 32nd season of Dukes football. They were led by head coach Mickey Matthews and played their home games at Bridgeforth Stadium in Harrisonburg, Virginia. The 2004 team came off of a 6–6 record the previous season. JMU finished the season 13–2 with a record of 7–1 in Atlantic 10 Conference play en route to the program's first NCAA Division I-AA national championship.

== Schedule ==
Date	Time	Opponent	Rank	Site	TV	Result	Attendance	Source
September 4		Lock Haven*		Bridgeforth Stadium; Harrisonburg, VA		W 62–7	10,221	
September 18	1:00 pm	at No. 5 Villanova		Villanova Stadium; Villanova, PA		W 17–0	3,123	
September 25	1:00 pm	at No. 7 (I-A) West Virginia*		Milan Puskar Stadium; Morgantown, WV		L 10–45	56,609	
October 2		Hofstra		Bridgeforth Stadium; Harrisonburg, VA		W 31–21	8,267	
October 9	1:30 pm	UMass	No. 19	Bridgeforth Stadium; Harrisonburg, VA		W 28–7	15,321	
October 16		at No. 12 Maine	No. 17	Alfond Stadium; Orono, ME		W 24–20	7,084	
October 23	3:00 pm	at Richmond	No. 13	University of Richmond Stadium; Richmond, VA (rivalry)		W 26–20	10,235	
October 30		VMI*	No. 9	Bridgeforth, Stadium; Harrisonburg, VA		W 41–10	15,312	
November 6	1:00 pm	No. 6 Delaware	No. 7	Bridgeforth Stadium; Harrisonburg, VA (rivalry)		W 20–13	12,683	
November 13	12:00 pm	No. 10 William & Mary	No. 4	Bridgeforth Stadium; Harrisonburg, VA (rivalry)	CSN	L 24–27	13,904	
November 20	1:00 pm	at Towson	No. 9	Johnny Unitas Stadium; Towson, MD		W 38–14	2,744	
November 27		at Lehigh*	No. 8	Goodman Stadium; Bethlehem, PA (NCAA Division I-AA First Round)		W 14–13	6,116	
December 4		at No. 2 Furman*	No. 8	Paladin Stadium; Greenville, SC (NCAA Division I-AA Quarterfinal)	ESPNGP	W 14–13	8,812	
December 10	7:00 pm	at No. 6 William & Mary*	No. 8	Zable Stadium; Williamsburg, VA (NCAA Division I-AA Semifinal)	ESPN2	W 48–34	12,259	
December 17	8:00 pm	vs. No. 7 Montana*	No. 8	Finley Stadium; Chattanooga, TN (NCAA Division I-AA Championship Game)	ESPN2	W 31–21	16,771	
*Non-conference game; Rankings from The Sports Network Poll released prior to the game; All times are in Eastern time
