= 2004 William & Mary Tribe football team =

American college football season

2004 William & Mary Tribe football

A-10 South Division co-champion

NCAA Division I-AA Semifinal, L 34–48 vs. James Madison
- Conference: Atlantic 10 Conference
- South Division

Ranking
- Sports Network: No. 3
- Record: 11–3 (7–1 A-10)
- Head coach: Jimmye Laycock (25th season)
- Offensive coordinator: Zbig Kepa (12th season)
- Captains: Lang Campbell; Wade Harrell
- Home stadium: Zable Stadium

2004 Atlantic 10 Conference football standings
	Conf.			Overall
Team	W		L	W		L
North Division
No. 6 New Hampshire x^	6	–	2	11	–	3
UMass	4	–	4	6	–	5
Northeastern	4	–	4	5	–	6
Hofstra	3	–	5	5	–	6
Maine	3	–	5	5	–	6
Rhode Island	2	–	6	4	–	7
South Division
No. 1 James Madison x^	7	–	1	13	–	2
No. 3 William & Mary x^	7	–	1	11	–	3
No. 7 Delaware x^	7	–	1	9	–	4
Villanova	3	–	5	6	–	5
Richmond	2	–	6	3	–	8
Towson	0	–	8	3	–	8
x – Division champion/co-champions; ^ – NCAA Division I-AA playoff participant; Rankings from The Sports Network poll

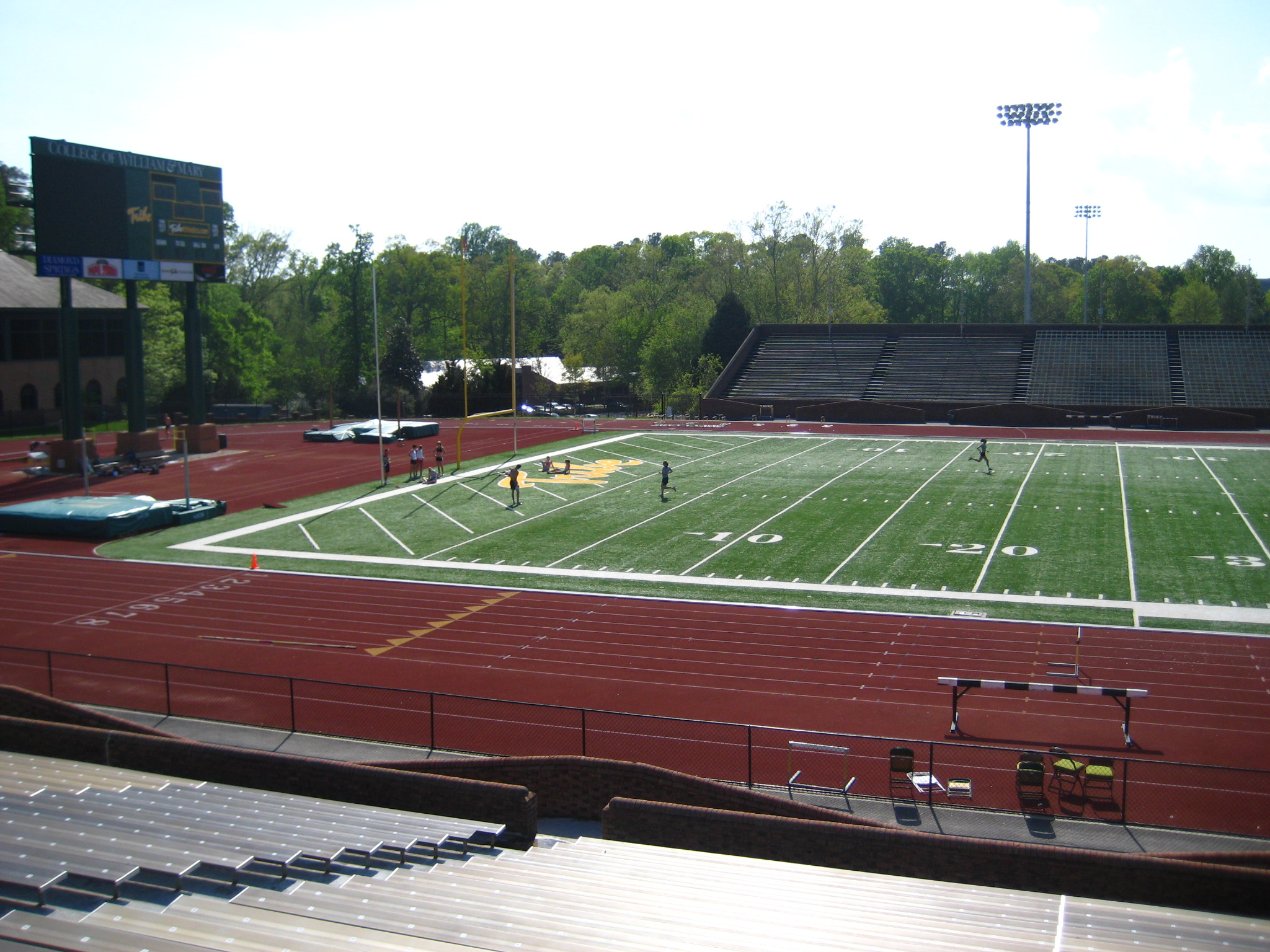
Renovations to Zable Stadium have included replacing natural grass with FieldTurf Pro, installing lights to allow for night games and the addition of a new scoreboard (shown).

The 2004 William & Mary Tribe football team represented the College of William & Mary in the 2004 NCAA Division I-AA football season. William & Mary competed as a member of the Atlantic 10 Conference (A-10) under head football coach Jimmye Laycock and played their home games at Zable Stadium.

The 2004 Tribe football team is considered, within the William & Mary community, to be one of the two greatest teams ever assembled at the college (the other being the 2009 team). For the first time William & Mary reached the NCAA Division I-AA Semifinals. They set a single season school record for wins (11) and were A-10 Conference co-champions after going 7–1 in conference play. Many Tribe players garnered postseason awards and accolades, highlighted by quarterback Lang Campbell's selection as the 2004 Walter Payton Award winner, which is given annually to the most outstanding offensive player in the Division I FCS of college football as chosen by a nationwide panel of media and college sports information directors.

William & Mary finished the 2004 season ranked No. 3 nationally in the final Division I-AA polls. No team in school history had ever finished with a ranking that high, nor had any Tribe squad even reached #3 at any point during any season.

== Preseason ==
The Tribe were not nationally ranked heading into the 2004 season. Coming off of a 5–5 record in 2003 in which they had failed to qualify for the playoffs, national media did not predict much more success for them in 2004. They had lost Rich Musinski to graduation—a wide receiver who graduated as one of three players in NCAA history to collect more than 4,000 receiving yards. Though quarterback Campbell was returning for his redshirt senior season, he was not expected to lead the Tribe to the success they would later achieve.

== Schedule ==
Date	Time	Opponent	Rank	Site	TV	Result	Attendance
September 4	1:30 pm	at North Carolina*		Kenan Memorial Stadium; Chapel Hill, NC		L 38–49	43,500
September 18	12:00 pm	at No. 10 New Hampshire		Cowell Stadium; Durham, NH		W 9–7	3,512
September 25	1:00 pm	VMI*		Zable Stadium; Williamsburg, VA (rivalry)		W 42–6	8,101
October 2	1:00 pm	No. 16 Northeastern		Zable Stadium; Williamsburg, VA		W 38–35 ^{OT}	8,267
October 9	7:00 pm	at Liberty*	No. 18	Williams Stadium; Lynchburg, VA		W 37–17	9,603
October 16	1:00 pm	Rhode Island^{†}	No. 16	Zable Stadium; Williamsburg, VA		W 31–24	8,774
October 23	1:00 pm	at No. 3 Delaware	No. 14	Delaware Stadium; Newark, DE (rivalry)		L 28–31	22,058
October 30	6:00 pm	at Towson	No. 16	Johnny Unitas Stadium; Towson, MD		W 41–16	3,280
November 6	1:00 pm	No. 19 Villanova	No. 13	Zable Stadium; Williamsburg, VA		W 37–29	6,755
November 13	12:00 pm	at No. 4 James Madison	No. 10	Bridgeforth Stadium; Harrisonburg, VA (rivalry)	CSN	W 27–24	13,904
November 20	1:00 pm	Richmond	No. 6	Zable Stadium; Williamsburg, VA (I-64 Bowl)		W 38–14	8,325
November 27	12:00 pm	No. 11 Hampton*	No. 6	Zable Stadium; Williamsburg, VA (NCAA Division I-AA First Round)		W 42–35	5,576
December 4	12:00 pm	No. 10 Delaware*	No. 6	Zable Stadium; Williamsburg, VA (NCAA Division I-AA Quarterfinal)	ESPNGP	W 44–38 ^{2OT}	8,875
December 10	7:00 pm	No. 8 James Madison*	No. 6	Zable Stadium; Williamsburg, VA (NCAA Division I-AA Semifinal)	ESPN2	L 34–48	12,259
*Non-conference game; ^{†}Homecoming; Rankings from The Sports Network Poll released prior to the game; All times are in Eastern time

== Regular season ==
=== @ North Carolina ===
	1	2	3	4	Total
William & Mary	14	10	7	7	38
North Carolina	7	7	14	21	49

The Tribe began their 2004 campaign by traveling to Chapel Hill, North Carolina to take on the UNC Tar Heels of the Football Bowl Subdivision (FBS). Over 43,500 people went to Kenan Memorial Stadium to see the match-up. Despite holding a 24–14 halftime lead, the Tribe could not hold on for the victory, losing 38–49.

=== @ #10 New Hampshire ===
	1	2	3	4	Total
William & Mary	0	3	6	0	9
New Hampshire	7	0	0	0	7

After a bye-week, William & Mary resumed their season on September 18 against #10-ranked New Hampshire in Durham. This contest began conference play. The unranked Tribe only mustered three field goals for the match, but it proved to be enough as they came away with a 9–7 win. And, despite the lack of offense, William & Mary held the Wildcats scoreless for the last 50:48 of the game in the come-from-behind victory.

=== Virginia Military Institute ===
	1	2	3	4	Total
VMI	0	6	0	0	6
William & Mary	0	28	7	7	42

Game 3 pitted William & Mary against a lesser VMI Keydets team. They led 28–6 at halftime, and the lead bulged to 35–6 by the end of the third quarter. The Tribe won the non-conference game 42–6. William & Mary plays the Virginia Military Institute nearly every season, and consequently a friendly rivalry has spawned from it.

=== #16 Northeastern ===
	1	2	3	4	OT	Total
Northeastern	0	14	14	7	0	35
William & Mary	7	7	10	11	3	38

On October 2, the #16-ranked Northeastern Huskies traveled to Williamsburg to face the unranked Tribe. The contest was evenly matched as both teams headed into halftime tied at 14. William & Mary trailed by four points going into the fourth quarter, but a field goal by All-American kicker Greg Kuehn and a receiving touchdown by future National Football League player Dominique Thompson, followed by a successful two-point conversion, provided the Tribe with 11 points in the final period. Northeastern had also scored one touchdown, and the game went to overtime knotted at 35 points apiece. William & Mary's ability to convert a field goal attempt, coupled with their defense holding the Huskies from scoring any points in the extra period, gave the Tribe a 38–35 win at home. It was the second victory over a ranked opponent by unranked William & Mary.

=== @ Liberty ===
	1	2	3	4	Total
William & Mary	10	10	10	7	37
Liberty	3	0	7	7	17

William & Mary faced the Liberty Flames in Lynchburg on October 9. The Tribe scored 10 points in each of the first three quarters en route to their second non-conference win of 2004. They scored seven more insurance points in the fourth quarter to finish the game with 37 while Liberty managed only 17 of their own.

The contest marked the first time of the 2004 season that William & Mary entered a game ranked in the Top 25 nationally. Heading into the game, the 3–1 Tribe were ranked #18.

=== Rhode Island ===
	1	2	3	4	Total
Rhode Island	7	3	7	7	24
William & Mary	14	3	7	7	31

The Tribe fell behind 7–0 within the first three minutes of the game after the Rams connected on a 52-yard touchdown pass. By the end of the first quarter, however, the Tribe had scored two unanswered touchdowns of their own to take a 14–7 lead. After exchanging field goals in the second quarter, the two teams went into halftime by a score of 17–10. The Rams scored first during the third quarter when they finished their drive with a five-yard touchdown run to tie the game. After William & Mary responded with another touchdown of their own, Rhode Island kept chipping away at the defense and would eventually tie the score at 24. Once again, the Tribe responded. With 8:09 left to play, running back Elijah Brooks powered in for a score from two yards out. Neither team would score again, and William & Mary won 31–24.

=== @ #3 Delaware ===
	1	2	3	4	Total
William & Mary	21	0	0	7	28
Delaware	7	17	0	7	31

In a highly anticipated match-up between two ranked teams, the #14 Tribe traveled north to Newark to play #3 Delaware. It only took 2:27 for William & Mary to score first on a 10-yard touchdown pass to Dominique Thompson. The Blue Hens only mustered a three-and-out on their first possession, and, less than one minute after their first touchdown, Lang Campbell once again found Thompson, this time for a 62-yard touchdown pass. At the 6:12 mark of the first quarter, Delaware would finally get on the scoreboard with a touchdown of their own. But as the Blue Hens soon found out, the first quarter belonged to Dominique Thompson, who hauled in his third touchdown reception, which was 87 yards, with 4:26 to play. It looked as though William & Mary would win the match in a runaway. A 17–0 shutout of the Tribe in the second quarter quickly squashed that idea, and the teams went into halftime separated by three points. The second half was a much more defensive struggle than the first, as both teams only mustered one touchdown and zero field goals apiece (both in the fourth quarter). A fast William & Mary start would not sustain, and the Blue Hens "upset" the lower-ranked Tribe 31–28. The high intensity of the game foreshadowed another great match-up to come later in the season.

=== @ Towson ===
	1	2	3	4	Total
William & Mary	7	17	14	3	41
Towson	3	0	0	13	16

Like the previous game against Delaware, William & Mary wide receiver Dominique Thompson burned the opposition in the first quarter. Less than two minutes into the game, Lang Campbell connected with Thompson on a 46-yard touchdown throw. Towson would kick a field goal, but that was all the scoring by either team for the first 15 minutes. The middle two quarters belonged to the Tribe as they scored four touchdowns and a field goal to take a 38–3 lead into the final frame. With their substitutes playing most of the fourth quarter, William & Mary gave up 13 points to the Tigers and only managed three of their own. It did not matter as they would roll to a 41–16 win.

=== #19 Villanova ===
	1	2	3	4	Total
Villanova	7	14	0	8	29
William & Mary	7	7	9	14	37

On November 6, #19 Villanova traveled to Williamsburg as the #13 Tribe played their fourth ranked opponent of the season. Things did not start well for William & Mary. Wildcat Martin Gibson returned the opening kickoff 95 yards for a quick touchdown. Several minutes later, however, Tribe running back Jon Smith punched in a 1-yard touchdown run of his own. A Greg Kuehn PAT was good and the two teams were tied at seven. In the second quarter, Villanova would take a 14–7 lead at the 12:38 mark on a touchdown pass. William & Mary responded four minutes later to tie the game, but another Villanova touchdown with 3:38 left would make the score 21–14 at halftime in favor of the Wildcats. In the second half, the Tribe would go on to score three unanswered touchdowns and force a safety to take a 37–21 lead. Villanova would not score again until 32 seconds remained, but by then the game was out of reach and William & Mary had earned their seventh win of the season.

=== @ #4 James Madison ===
	1	2	3	4	Total
William & Mary	0	3	7	17	27
James Madison	3	7	0	14	24

Unlike the University of Richmond football rivalry, which is specific to one sport, the W&M–JMU athletic rivalry spans across the board to all sports. When the #10 Tribe went to Harrisonburg to play #4 James Madison, both teams were intense from the start. The first quarter was a defensive battle as neither team conceded good field position to the other. It was not until 2:49 was left that the first points were scored—a David Rabil 28-yard field goal for JMU. William & Mary tied the game with a Kuehn field goal in the second quarter, but the Dukes took a 10–3 lead with 3:19 left in the first half on a 17-yard passing touchdown. William & Mary played well in the third quarter, outscoring rival Madison 7–0. In the decisive fourth quarter, the Dukes would score first after punching in a 4-yard touchdown run. After two straight passing touchdowns by Campbell, the Tribe had taken the lead, 24–17. Madison responded to tie the match with only 45 seconds remaining after a successful 27-yard touchdown pass. Once William & Mary received the ball on the ensuing kick-off, they drove 43 yards in five plays to set up a potential game-winning field goal. After a timeout, Tribe kicker Greg Kuehn drilled a 45-yard field goal as time expired, giving William & Mary the upset win. The Tribe team and attending fans swarmed the field as they reveled in their defeat of their archrivals in dramatic fashion.

=== Richmond (I-64 Bowl) ===
	1	2	3	4	Total
Richmond	0	0	0	14	14
William & Mary	7	7	24	0	38

On November 20, the Richmond Spiders came to William & Mary for the 114th all-time meeting between the teams. The winner of the annual contest—dubbed the I-64 Bowl—receives the I-64 Trophy. Prior to kick-off, W&M held the series edge 58–50–5. Regardless of how either team is doing in a particular season, the I-64 Bowl is always a match of pride between schools.

The first quarter was relatively fruitless for both teams. The only points came on a 25-yard pass to Thompson from Campbell to cap a 9-play, 80-yard drive. After a Kuehn kick, the Tribe led 7–0. The second quarter was very similar; many plays, few points. Another W&M touchdown and PAT capped the first half scoring. In the third quarter, however, William & Mary blew a quasi-close game wide open. They outscored the Spiders 24–0 to take a 38–0 lead into the final frame. During the third, Adam Bratton caught two touchdown passes, Joe Nicholas caught one and Greg Kuehn finished off the scoring with a field goal. Richmond would not score their first points until 5:37 left in the game when David Freeman ran in a score from 16 yards out. The Spiders would make the final score look more respectable than it was by scoring another touchdown in garbage time on a seven-yard pass with only five seconds remaining. With the win, William & Mary not only secured their 59th all-time I-64 Trophy, but also a clinch of the Atlantic 10 Conference title.

== NCAA Division I-AA Playoffs ==
=== #11 Hampton (first round) ===
	1	2	3	4	Total
Hampton	13	0	8	14	35
William & Mary	0	7	14	21	42

As the 6th-ranked team nationally, William & Mary was able to host all of their playoff games (unless a higher-ranked team were to play them). In the opening round, the Tribe hosted the #11 Hampton Pirates.

Hampton was able to jump on William & Mary early. Running back Ardell Daniels punched in a 1-yard touchdown score 4:01 into the first quarter to cap a four-play, 51-yard scoring drive. Several series by both teams followed, none of which resulted in any points. The Pirates would score their second touchdown with 3:31 left in the first quarter, but the PAT was blocked and the score remained 13–0. Both teams were evenly matched in the deeply contested match. The second quarter offered little offense. The only points came from the Tribe's 8-yard touchdown pass to Bratton. William & Mary was losing 13–7, in their home stadium, at the half.

The second half was a much more offensively-oriented game. The Tribe received the opening kickoff, and less than two minutes later, Campbell found Thompson on a 27-yard touchdown pass. Greg Kuehn made the extra point, and William & Mary was now ahead 14–13. Hampton, however, quickly responded. Jerome Mathis returned the ensuing kickoff 93 yards for the Pirates' third score of the day. They completed a two-point conversion to take a 21–14 lead. There was one more score of the third quarter – a 4-yard run by William & Mary's Jon Smith. The teams headed into the final 15 minutes tied at 21.

Hampton once again scored first. Jerome Mathis caught his second touchdown pass when Pirates quarterback Prince Shepherd connected with him for a 43-yard score. Like Hampton had done to them earlier, the Tribe responded by returning the ensuing kickoff 92 yards for a quick score. The game was now knotted at 28 points with fewer than twelve minutes remaining. William & Mary was able to stop Hampton on the next series for a timely defensive effort. The high-scoring Tribe offense then took the field and, like many times before over the course of the season, Lang Campbell found Dominique Thompson for a touchdown pass. This time it came as the first play of scrimmage in a one-play, 45-yard pass that encompassed nine seconds. For the first time all game, William & Mary held a lead of seven points. Hampton was unable to respond. Their next offensive series produced zero points, giving possession back to William & Mary. The Tribe then took advantage of their opportunity. Smith ran in his second touchdown of the contest when he punched in a 4-yard run with only 1:58 remaining.

Hampton had no choice but to use a no-huddle, hurry-up offense. They managed to complete an eight-play, 56-yard drive to score on Prince's 7-yard quarterback scurry with 32 seconds remaining. After a successful PAT, the Pirates attempted an onside kick but could not recover it. The Tribe burned the rest of the game clock and walked away with a 42–35 opening round victory—their first playoff win since 1996 when they beat Jacksonville State.

Scoring summary

Quarter	Time	Drive			Team	Scoring information	Score	
Quarter	Time	Plays	Yards	TOP	Team	Scoring information	HAM	W&M
1	10:59		51	1:35	HAM	Ardell Daniels 1-yard touchdown run, Andrew Paterini kick good	7	0
1	3:31		80	0:14	HAM	Jerome Mathis 80-yard touchdown reception from Prince Shepherd, Andrew Paterini kick no good (blocked)	13	0
2	9:23		80	3:06	W&M	Adam Bratton 8-yard touchdown reception from Lang Campbell, Greg Kuehn kick good	13	7
3	13:08		74	1:52	W&M	Dominique Thompson 27-yard touchdown reception from Lang Campbell, Greg Kuehn kick good	13	14
3	12:55		—	—	HAM	Jerome Mathis 93-yard kickoff return touchdown, Jason Morgan pass from Prince Shepherd good	21	14
3	5:33		56	1:27	W&M	Jon Smith 4-yard touchdown run, Greg Kuehn kick good	21	21
4	12:01		78	2:59	HAM	Jerome Mathis 43-yard touchdown reception from Prince Shepherd, Andrew Paterini kick good	28	21
4	11:47		—	—	W&M	Dominique Thompson 92-yard kickoff return touchdown, Greg Kuehn kick good	28	28
4	9:58		45	0:09	W&M	Dominique Thompson 45-yard touchdown reception from Lang Campbell, Greg Kuehn kick good	28	35
4	1:56		60	1:53	W&M	Jon Smith 4-yard touchdown run, Greg Kuehn kick good	28	42
4	0:32		56	1:24	HAM	Prince Shepherd 7-yard touchdown run, Andrew Paterini kick good	35	42
"TOP" = time of possession. For other American football terms, see Glossary of American football.							35	42

=== #10 Delaware (Quarterfinals) ===
	1	2	3	4	OT	2OT	Total
Delaware	14	17	0	0	7	0	38
William & Mary	7	3	0	21	7	6	44

The 2004 Division I-AA Quarterfinal match-up against the defending national champion University of Delaware Fightin' Blue Hens was one of the most prolific football games in a long William & Mary history. The Tribe hosted the Blue Hens at Zable Stadium on a cold December 4 afternoon. When the double-overtime game finally ended, the Tribe had accumulated 500 yards of offense while Delaware accounted for 491 of their own. The match was also the largest come-from-behind win in Tribe history after they erased a Blue Hen 21-point fourth-quarter lead to send the game into extra sessions.

Delaware opened the contest's scoring with an Omar Cuff 37-yard touchdown run 3:32 into the first quarter. A little over one minute later, Tribe quarterback Lang Campbell (30-of-53, 342 yards, three touchdowns, no interceptions) would find receiver John Pitts for an 11-yard passing score to even the game at seven apiece. Cuff would score during the first quarter once more, however, as the Blue Hens took a 14–7 lead. In the second quarter, Delaware added to their lead and seemingly put the game out of reach by halftime. Blue Hens quarterback Sonny Riccio (24-of-41, 262 yards, three touchdowns, 2 INTs) connected two times for scores with David Boler in addition to a Brad Shushman field goal. William & Mary's only points came from a Greg Kuehn field goal. Delaware outscored William & Mary 17–3 during the period and took a 31–10 lead into halftime.

The third quarter was a defensive battle as neither team was able to put any points on the board. The score remained a 21-point deficit for the Tribe at the start of the fourth quarter. William & Mary exploded offensively in the quarter, however, and (with a staunch defensive effort) came back to force overtime at 31–31 by putting up 21 straight points in the frame. Stephen Cason ran back an interception 62 yards for a touchdown 10 seconds into the quarter, Jon Smith scored on a two-yard touchdown run, and Campbell threw a 15-yard scoring pass to Joe Nicholas with just under two minutes to play. The miraculous comeback was not complete as the game headed into overtime. Delaware struck first when Justin Long caught a seven-yard touchdown pass from Riccio for a 38–31 Delaware advantage. The Tribe countered with a two-yard touchdown pass from Nicholas, which knotted the score at 38 apiece and set the stage for Smith's heroics in the second overtime session. Kuehn missed his first extra point of the season after Smith scored, opening the door for a Delaware victory on the ensuing possession. However, William & Mary stopped the Blue Hens on the next possession to steal the six-point win.

William & Mary fans stormed Zable Stadium and celebrated on the middle of the field after the game concluded. The win also thrust the Tribe into their first-ever national semifinal playoff game, which was to be against their biggest rival, James Madison University.

Scoring summary

Quarter	Time	Drive			Team	Scoring information	Score	
Quarter	Time	Plays	Yards	TOP	Team	Scoring information	DEL	W&M
1	11:28		52	0:19	DEL	Omar Cuff 37-yard touchdown run, Brad Shushman kick good	7	0
1	10:14		72	1:14	W&M	John Pitts 11-yard touchdown reception from Lang Campbell, Greg Kuehn kick good	7	7
1	3:57		77	6:17	DEL	Omar Cuff 5-yard touchdown run, Brad Shushman kick good	14	7
2	14:30		83	2:07	DEL	David Boler 58-yard touchdown reception from Sonny Riccio, Brad Shushman kick good	21	7
2	11:07		52	3:23	W&M	37-yard field goal by Greg Kuehn	21	10
2	7:51		32	3:16	DEL	31-yard field goal by Brad Shushman	24	10
2	1:02		74	2:48	DEL	David Boler 15-yard touchdown reception from Sonny Riccio, Brad Shushman kick good	31	10
4	14:50		—	—	W&M	Interception returned 62 yards for touchdown by Stephen Cason, Greg Kuehn kick good	31	17
4	9:56		57	3:04	W&M	Jon Smith 2-yard touchdown run, Greg Kuehn kick good	31	24
4	1:56		68	6:24	W&M	Joe Nicholas 15-yard touchdown reception from Lang Campbell, Greg Kuehn kick good	31	31
OT	15:00		25	—	DEL	Justin Long 7-yard touchdown reception from Sonny Riccio, Brad Shushman kick good	38	31
OT	15:00		25	—	W&M	Joe Nicholas 2-yard touchdown reception from Lang Campbell, Greg Kuehn kick good	38	38
2OT	15:00		25	—	W&M	Jon Smith 7-yard touchdown run, Greg Kuehn kick no good	38	44
"TOP" = time of possession. For other American football terms, see Glossary of American football.							38	44

=== #8 James Madison (Semifinals) ===
	1	2	3	4	Total
James Madison	21	0	20	7	48
William & Mary	0	20	6	8	34

For the first time since the 1930s, William & Mary hosted a night-time football game. Using temporary stadium lights to illuminate the field and stands, the sold-out Division I-AA semifinal against James Madison was broadcast live on the ESPN2 television network. The Tribe had a six-game winning streak heading into the contest, and the Dukes had only two losses all season—one early season loss to Division I-A power West Virginia, and the other to William & Mary on a last second field goal. Whereas the Tribe won their first two playoff games at home, James Madison was forced to win both of theirs on the road.

In the game's early going, all momentum and big plays were going Madison's way. They trounced William & Mary in the first quarter and went up 21–0 by virtue of rushing, passing and interception touchdowns. The game seemed out of reach for the Tribe before a blink of an eye. However, as quickly as the Dukes gained a lead, they gave it right back. In the second quarter, Greg Kuehn got the Tribe's scoring started 1:22 in with a 27-yard field goal. After a defensive stop forced Madison to punt, William & Mary went on a 68-yard, 4:41 drive to score their first touchdown (a two-yard Lang Campbell run). Another empty possession for the Dukes gave the Tribe new life as they took advantage and scored another touchdown with 2:14 remaining in the half to cut the deficit to four. After forcing a third straight punt, William & Mary capitalized for a fourth time in the second quarter as Kuehn made a 42-yard field goal as time expired in the first half. After being down 21–0 after one quarter, William & Mary crawled back to nearly even the score at 21–20.

The Tribe continued their scoring in the third quarter when Campbell found Dominique Thompson for a seven-yard touchdown pass 3:23 into the half. They took their first lead of the game, 27–21. Less than one minute later, however, the Dukes responded with a two-play, 63-yard drive capped by a touchdown pass to D. D. Boxley from quarterback Justin Rascati. On William & Mary's next three possessions, they lost two fumbles and were forced to punt, giving the ball back to JMU each time. The Dukes took advantage of two of those possessions by scoring one rushing and one passing touchdown to take a 41–26 lead into the final frame. In the fourth quarter, Madison scored an insurance touchdown with 8:01 remaining when Alvin Banks punched in a one-yard run. The Tribe would not score again until a four-yard Campbell hook-up with John Pitts with 1:21 remaining in the game. In a game of runs, James Madison University would prevail to move on to the 2004 Division I-AA National Championship that they would later win, becoming the first time in history to win a national championship by defeating every team on the road. With the loss, William & Mary's record-breaking season ended, but myriad individual and team accolades were still to come.

Scoring summary

Quarter	Time	Drive			Team	Scoring information	Score	
Quarter	Time	Plays	Yards	TOP	Team	Scoring information	JMU	W&M
1	12:32		73	2:28	JMU	Raymond Hines 27-yard touchdown run, David Rabil kick good	7	0
1	6:08		25	1:01	JMU	Casime Harris 19-yard touchdown reception from Justin Rascati, David Rabil kick good	14	0
1	4:02		—	—	JMU	Interception returned 69 yards for touchdown by Clint Kent, David Rabil kick good	21	0
2	13:38		65	5:24	W&M	27-yard field goal by Greg Kuehn	21	3
2	6:20		68	4:41	W&M	Lang Campbell 2-yard touchdown run, Greg Kuehn kick good	21	10
2	2:14		60	2:18	W&M	Joe Nicholas 9-yard touchdown reception from Lang Campbell, Greg Kuehn kick good	21	17
2	0:00		34	0:40	W&M	42-yard field goal by Greg Kuehn	21	20
3	11:37		73	3:23	W&M	Dominique Thompson 7-yard touchdown reception from Lang Campbell, 2-point pass failed	21	26
3	11:00		63	0:37	JMU	D. D. Boxley 34-yard touchdown reception from Justin Rascati, 2-point pass failed	27	26
3	4:24		48	5:09	JMU	Chris Iorio 4-yard touchdown run, David Rabil kick good	34	26
3	2:45		18	1:22	JMU	Antoinne Bolton 13-yard touchdown reception from Justin Rascati, David Rabil kick good	41	26
4	8:01		58	8:36	JMU	Alvin Banks 1-yard touchdown run, David Rabil kick good	48	26
4	1:21		70	1:19	W&M	John Pitts 4-yard touchdown reception from Lang Campbell, 2-point run good	48	34
"TOP" = time of possession. For other American football terms, see Glossary of American football.							48	34

== Awards and accomplishments ==
=== Individual ===
- Lang Campbell (QB)
  - Walter Payton Award winner
  - Associated Press I-AA All-America First Team
  - A-10 Conference Offensive Player of the Year
  - A-10 Conference Scholar-Athlete of the Year
  - All A-10 Conference First Team
  - Eastern College Athletic Conference (ECAC) Player of the Year
  - All ECAC First Team
- Stephen Cason (DB)
  - All A-10 Conference Second Team
- Greg Kuehn (PK)
  - Associated Press I-AA All-America Third Team
  - A-10 Special Teams Player of the Year
  - All A-10 Conference First Team
- Mike Mesi (P)
  - All A-10 Conference Third Team
- Cody Morris (OL)
  - All A-10 Conference Second Team
- Chris Ndubueze (LB)
  - All A-10 Conference Third Team
- Adam O'Connor (DE)
  - Associated Press I-AA All-America Third Team
  - All A-10 Conference First Team
- Jon Smith (RB)
  - All A-10 Conference Third Team
- Dominique Thompson (WR)
  - Associated Press I-AA All-America Second Team
  - All A-10 Conference Second Team

=== Team ===
- #3 final national ranking (school record)
- Atlantic 10 Conference Co-Champions
- NCAA Division I-AA semi-finalist
- 11 wins (school record)
- Perfect regular season home record (5–0)
- I-64 Bowl winner (annual rivalry game with Richmond)
- One of only two programs (Duke) in Division I and Division I-AA with a 100 percent graduation rate among football players who receive athletic aid in the form of grants and scholarships
