= 2004 Western Carolina Catamounts football team =

American college football season

2004 Western Carolina Catamounts football
- Conference: Southern Conference
- Record: 4–7 (2–5 SoCon)
- Head coach: Kent Briggs (3rd season)
- Defensive coordinator: Geoff Collins (3rd season)
- Home stadium: Bob Waters Field at E. J. Whitmire Stadium

2004 Southern Conference football standings
	Conf.			Overall
Team	W		L	W		L
No. 5 Furman $^	6	–	1	10	–	3
No. 10 Georgia Southern $^	6	–	1	9	–	3
No. 18 Wofford	4	–	3	8	–	3
Appalachian State	4	–	3	6	–	5
Western Carolina	2	–	5	4	–	7
The Citadel	2	–	5	3	–	7
Elon	2	–	5	3	–	8
Chattanooga	2	–	5	2	–	9
$ – Conference champion; ^ – NCAA Division I-AA playoff participant; Rankings from The Sports Network I-AA Poll

The 2004 Western Carolina Catamounts team represented Western Carolina University as a member of the Southern Conference (SoCon) in the 2004 NCAA Division I-AA football season. The Catamounts were led by third-year head coach Kent Briggs and played their home games at Bob Waters Field at E. J. Whitmire Stadium. They finished the season 4–7 and 2–5 in SoCon play.

== Schedule ==
Date	Time	Opponent	Rank	Site	TV	Result	Attendance	Source
September 2	7:00 p.m.	West Virginia State*		Bob Waters Field at E. J. Whitmire Stadium; Cullowhee, NC		W 77–7	6,668	
September 11	4:00 p.m.	Nicholls State*		Bob Waters Field at E. J. Whitmire Stadium; Cullowhee, NC		W 28–7	6,972	
September 18	7:00 p.m.	at Alabama*		Bryant–Denny Stadium; Tuscaloosa, AL		L 0–52	77,306	
September 25	6:00 p.m.	at Gardner–Webb*	No. 25	Ernest W. Spangler Stadium; Boiling Springs, NC		L 20–26 ^{OT}	6,311	
October 2	2:00 p.m.	No. 2 Furman		Paladin Stadium; Greenville, SC		L 10–31	14,412	
October 9	4:00 p.m.	No. 3 Georgia Southern		Bob Waters Field at E. J. Whitmire Stadium; Cullowhee, NC		L 16–38	10,970	
October 16	1:30 p.m.	at No. 6 Wofford		Gibbs Stadium; Spartanburg, SC		L 12–15	8,771	
October 23	2:00 p.m.	Chattanooga^{†}		Bob Waters Field at E. J. Whitmire Stadium; Cullowhee, NC		L 24–27	8,743	
October 30	2:00 p.m.	at Elon		Rhodes Stadium; Elon, NC		W 28–7	7,328	
November 13	4:00 p.m.	Appalachian State		Bob Waters Field at E. J. Whitmire Stadium; Cullowhee, NC (rivalry)	CSET	W 30–27	14,741	
November 20	12:00 p.m.	at The Citadel		Johnson Hagood Stadium; Charleston, SC		L 0–17	3,874	
*Non-conference game; ^{†}Homecoming; Rankings from The Sports Network Poll released prior to the game; All times are in Eastern time
