= 2006 Jackson State Tigers football team =

American college football season

2006 Jackson State Tigers football
- Conference: Southwestern Athletic Conference
- East Division
- Record: 6–5 (5–4 SWAC)
- Head coach: Rick Comegy (1st season)
- Home stadium: Mississippi Veterans Memorial Stadium

2006 Southwestern Athletic Conference football standings
	Conf.			Overall
Team	W		L	W		L
East Division
Alabama A&M xy$	6	–	3	9	–	3
Jackson State	5	–	4	6	–	5
Alcorn State	5	–	4	6	–	5
Mississippi Valley State	5	–	4	6	–	5
Alabama State	5	–	4	5	–	6
West Division
Arkansas–Pine Bluff xy	7	–	2	8	–	4
Southern	4	–	5	5	–	6
Grambling State	3	–	6	3	–	8
Texas Southern	3	–	6	3	–	8
Prairie View A&M	2	–	7	3	–	7
Championship: Alabama A&M 22, Arkansas–Pine Bluff 13
$ – Conference champion; x – Division champion/co-champions; y – Championship game participant

The 2006 Jackson State Tigers football team represented Jackson State University as a member of the Southwestern Athletic Conference (SWAC) during the 2006 NCAA Division I FCS football season. Led by first-year head coach Rick Comegy, the Tigers compiled an overall record of 6–5 and a mark of 5–4 in conference play, and finished tied for second in the SWAC East Division.

== Schedule ==
Date	Opponent	Site	Result	Attendance	Source
September 2	Paul Quinn*	Mississippi Veterans Memorial Stadium; Jackson, MS	W 44–20	11,500	
September 16	vs. Tennessee State*	Liberty Bowl Memorial Stadium; Memphis, TN (Southern Heritage Classic)	L 30–31 ^{OT}	53,441	
September 23	Mississippi Valley State	Mississippi Veterans Memorial Stadium; Jackson, MS	W 29–24	28,718	
September 30	at Texas Southern	Alexander Durley Sports Complex; Houston, TX	W 29–5	14,383	
October 7	vs. Alabama State	Ladd–Peebles Stadium; Mobile, AL (Gulf Coast Classic)	W 19–13		
October 14	Southern	Mississippi Veterans Memorial Stadium; Jackson, MS (rivalry)	W 31–28 ^{2OT}		
October 21	at Grambling State	Eddie G. Robinson Memorial Stadium; Grambling, LA	L 7–36	18,883	
October 28	at Arkansas–Pine Bluff	Golden Lion Stadium; Pine Bluff, AR	L 40–43	6,556	
November 4	Alabama A&M	Mississippi Veterans Memorial Stadium; Jackson, MS	L 21–34	8,583	
November 11	Prairie View A&M	Mississippi Veterans Memorial Stadium; Jackson, MS	W 31–7		
November 18	Alcorn State	Mississippi Veterans Memorial Stadium; Jackson, MS (Soul Bowl)	L 31–32		
*Non-conference game
