= 2006 Alabama A&M Bulldogs football team =

American college football season

2006 Alabama A&M Bulldogs football

SWAC East Division champion SWAC champion

SWAC Championship Game, W 22–13 vs. Arkansas–Pine Bluff
- Conference: Southwestern Athletic Conference
- Record: 9–3 (7–3 SWAC)
- Head coach: Anthony Jones (5th season)
- Home stadium: Louis Crews Stadium

2006 Southwestern Athletic Conference football standings
	Conf.			Overall
Team	W		L	W		L
East Division
Alabama A&M xy$	6	–	3	9	–	3
Jackson State	5	–	4	6	–	5
Alcorn State	5	–	4	6	–	5
Mississippi Valley State	5	–	4	6	–	5
Alabama State	5	–	4	5	–	6
West Division
Arkansas–Pine Bluff xy	7	–	2	8	–	4
Southern	4	–	5	5	–	6
Grambling State	3	–	6	3	–	8
Texas Southern	3	–	6	3	–	8
Prairie View A&M	2	–	7	3	–	7
Championship: Alabama A&M 22, Arkansas–Pine Bluff 13
$ – Conference champion; x – Division champion/co-champions; y – Championship game participant

The 2006 Alabama A&M Bulldogs football team represented Alabama A&M University as a member of the Southwestern Athletic Conference (SWAC) during the 2006 NCAA Division I FCS football season. Led by fifth-year head coach Anthony Jones, the Bulldogs compiled an overall record of 9–3 and a mark of 7–3 in conference play, and finished as SWAC champion.

== Schedule ==
Date	Opponent	Site	Result	Attendance	Source
September 2	at Tennessee State*	LP Field; Nashville, TN	W 27–20	19,487	
September 9	Grambling State	Louis Crews Stadium; Normal, AL	W 30–27 ^{OT}	8,300	
September 16	at Mississippi Valley State	Rice–Totten Stadium; Itta Bena, MS	L 20–23		
September 23	at Texas Southern	Alexander Durley Sports Complex; Houston, TX	W 19–14	13,000	
October 7	Southern	Louis Crews Stadium; Normal, AL	W 28–21		
October 14	Stillman*	Louis Crews Stadium; Normal, AL	W 21–14		
October 21	at Arkansas–Pine Bluff	Golden Lion Stadium; Pine Bluff, AR	L 21–23		
October 28	vs. Alabama State	Legion Field; Birmingham, AL (Magic City Classic)	W 21–13	66,233	
November 4	at Jackson State	Mississippi Veterans Memorial Stadium; Jackson, MS	W 34–21	8,583	
November 11	Alcorn State	Louis Crews Stadium; Normal, AL	W 35–26		
November 18	Prairie View A&M	Louis Crews Stadium; Normal, AL	L 7–13		
December 16	vs. Arkansas–Pine Bluff	Legion Field; Birmingham, AL (SWAC Championship Game)	W 22–13	30,213	
*Non-conference game
