= 2006 Mississippi Valley State Delta Devils football team =

American college football season

2006 Mississippi Valley State Delta Devils football
- Conference: Southwestern Athletic Conference
- East Division
- Record: 6–5 (5–4 SWAC)
- Head coach: Willie Totten (5th season)
- Defensive coordinator: Sam Washington (5th season)
- Home stadium: Rice–Totten Stadium

2006 Southwestern Athletic Conference football standings
	Conf.			Overall
Team	W		L	W		L
East Division
Alabama A&M xy$	6	–	3	9	–	3
Jackson State	5	–	4	6	–	5
Alcorn State	5	–	4	6	–	5
Mississippi Valley State	5	–	4	6	–	5
Alabama State	5	–	4	5	–	6
West Division
Arkansas–Pine Bluff xy	7	–	2	8	–	4
Southern	4	–	5	5	–	6
Grambling State	3	–	6	3	–	8
Texas Southern	3	–	6	3	–	8
Prairie View A&M	2	–	7	3	–	7
Championship: Alabama A&M 22, Arkansas–Pine Bluff 13
$ – Conference champion; x – Division champion/co-champions; y – Championship game participant

The 2006 Mississippi Valley State Delta Devils football team represented Mississippi Valley State University as a member of the Southwestern Athletic Conference (SWAC) during the 2006 NCAA Division I FCS football season. Led by fifth-year head coach Willie Totten, the Delta Devils compiled an overall record of 6–5 and a mark of 5–4 in conference play, and finished tied for third in the SWAC East Division.

== Schedule ==
Date	Opponent	Site	Result	Attendance	Source
September 2	vs. Arkansas–Pine Bluff	Soldier Field; Chicago, IL (Chicago Football Classic)	W 10–0	40,000	
September 9	at Southern	A. W. Mumford Stadium; Baton Rouge, LA	L 14–31		
September 16	Alabama A&M	Rice–Totten Stadium; Itta Bena, MS	W 23–20		
September 23	at Jackson State	Mississippi Veterans Memorial Stadium; Jackson, MS	L 24–29	28,718	
September 30	Concordia (AL)*	Rice–Totten Stadium; Itta Bena, MS	W 21–14		
October 7	Grambling State	Rice–Totten Stadium; Itta Bena, MS	L 25–28		
October 14	at No. 9 North Dakota State*	Fargodome; Fargo, ND	L 0–45	16,384	
October 21	at Texas Southern	Alexander Durley Sports Complex; Houston, TX	W 20–18	10,298	
October 28	Prairie View A&M	Rice–Totten Stadium; Itta Bena, MS	W 14–10		
November 4	Alcorn State	Rice–Totten Stadium; Itta Bena, MS	W 28–25		
November 11	at Alabama State	Cramton Bowl; Montgomery, AL	L 20–25		
*Non-conference game; Rankings from The Sports Network Poll released prior to the game
