= 2004 Appalachian State Mountaineers football team =

American college football season

2004 Appalachian State Mountaineers football
- Conference: Southern Conference
- Record: 6–5 (4–3 SoCon)
- Head coach: Jerry Moore (16th season)
- Offensive scheme: Multiple spread
- Base defense: 4–3
- Home stadium: Kidd Brewer Stadium

2004 Southern Conference football standings
	Conf.			Overall
Team	W		L	W		L
No. 5 Furman $^	6	–	1	10	–	3
No. 10 Georgia Southern $^	6	–	1	9	–	3
No. 18 Wofford	4	–	3	8	–	3
Appalachian State	4	–	3	6	–	5
Western Carolina	2	–	5	4	–	7
The Citadel	2	–	5	3	–	7
Elon	2	–	5	3	–	8
Chattanooga	2	–	5	2	–	9
$ – Conference champion; ^ – NCAA Division I-AA playoff participant; Rankings from The Sports Network I-AA Poll

The 2004 Appalachian State Mountaineers football team represented Appalachian State University as a member of the Southern Conference (SoCON) in the 2004 NCAA Division I-AA football season. Led by 16th-year head coach Jerry Moore, the Mountaineers compiled an overall record of 6–5 with a mark of 4–3 in conference play, placing second in the SoCon. The low point of the season was a 30–27 loss to rival Western Carolina in the Battle for the Old Mountain Jug. Home games were played at Kidd Brewer Stadium in Boone, North Carolina.

== Schedule ==
Date	Time	Opponent	Rank	Site	TV	Result	Attendance	Source
September 4	3:00 p.m.	at Wyoming*	No. 20	War Memorial Stadium; Laramie, WY		L 7–53	13,205	
September 11	2:00 p.m.	No. 20 Eastern Kentucky*	No. 24	Kidd Brewer Stadium; Boone, NC		W 49–21	12,353	
September 18	2:00 p.m.	The Citadel	No. 20	Kidd Brewer Stadium; Boone, NC		W 28–14	8,931	
September 25	5:00 p.m.	at No. 19 Northwestern State*	No. 17	Harry Turpin Stadium; Natchitoches, LA		L 35–40	10,282	
October 2	2:00 p.m.	Texas State*	No. 24	Kidd Brewer Stadium; Boone, NC		W 41–34	13,619	
October 9	3:30 p.m.	No. 2 Furman	No. 21	Kidd Brewer Stadium; Boone, NC	FSNS	W 30–29	15,311	
October 16	12:00 p.m.	at No. 2 Georgia Southern	No. 15	Paulson Stadium; Statesboro, GA	CSS	L 7–54	22,421	
October 23	3:00 p.m.	No. 5 Wofford^{†}	No. 23	Kidd Brewer Stadium; Boone, NC	CSTV	W 38–17	19,777	
October 30	6:00 p.m.	at Chattanooga	No. 17	Finley Stadium; Chattanooga, TN		L 56–59	4,486	
November 6	2:00 p.m.	Elon		Kidd Brewer Stadium; Boone, NC		W 48–7	11,347	
November 13	4:00 p.m.	at Western Carolina		E. J. Whitmire Stadium; Cullowhee, NC (rivalry)	CSET	L 27–30	14,714	
*Non-conference game; ^{†}Homecoming; Rankings from The Sports Network Poll released prior to the game; All times are in Eastern time
