= 2006 Texas Southern Tigers football team =

American college football season

2006 Texas Southern Tigers football
- Conference: Southwestern Athletic Conference
- West Division
- Record: 3–8 (3–6 SWAC)
- Head coach: Steve Wilson (3rd season)
- Home stadium: Reliant Stadium; Alexander Durley Sports Complex

2006 Southwestern Athletic Conference football standings
	Conf.			Overall
Team	W		L	W		L
East Division
Alabama A&M xy$	6	–	3	9	–	3
Jackson State	5	–	4	6	–	5
Alcorn State	5	–	4	6	–	5
Mississippi Valley State	5	–	4	6	–	5
Alabama State	5	–	4	5	–	6
West Division
Arkansas–Pine Bluff xy	7	–	2	8	–	4
Southern	4	–	5	5	–	6
Grambling State	3	–	6	3	–	8
Texas Southern	3	–	6	3	–	8
Prairie View A&M	2	–	7	3	–	7
Championship: Alabama A&M 22, Arkansas–Pine Bluff 13
$ – Conference champion; x – Division champion/co-champions; y – Championship game participant

The 2006 Texas Southern Tigers football team represented Texas Southern University as a member of the West Division of the Southwestern Athletic Conference (SWAC) during the 2006 NCAA Division I FCS football season. Led by third-year head coach Steve Wilson, the Tigers finished the season with an overall record of 3–8 and a mark of 3–6 in conference play, tying for third place in the SWAC's West Division.

== Schedule ==
Date	Time	Opponent	Site	Result	Attendance	Source
September 2	7:00 pm	Prairie View A&M	Reliant Stadium; Houston, TX	W 17–14	16,116	
September 9	6:00 pm	at Alabama State	Cramton Bowl; Montgomery, AL	W 10–9	20,000	
September 16	6:00 pm	at New Mexico State*	Aggie Memorial Stadium; Las Cruces, NM	L 14–48	15,450	
September 23	6:30 pm	Alabama A&M	Alexander Durley Sports Complex; Houston, TX	L 14–19	13,000	
September 30	2:00 pm	Jackson State	Alexander Durley Sports Complex; Houston, TX	L 5–29	14,383	
October 14	6:30 pm	at Alcorn State	Jack Spinks Stadium; Lorman, MS	L 23–44	11,797	
October 21	3:00 pm	Mississippi Valley State^{†}	Alexander Durley Sports Complex; Houston, TX	L 18–20	10,298	
October 28	3:00 pm	Grambling State	Alexander Durley Sports Complex; Houston, TX	W 33–28	15,215	
November 4	6:00 pm	at Southern	Ace W. Mumford Stadium; Baton Rouge, LA	L 17–34	14,116	
November 11	7:00 pm	at Texas State*	Bobcat Stadium; San Marcos, TX	L 21–41	12,593	
November 18	3:30 pm	at Arkansas–Pine Bluff	Golden Lion Stadium; Pine Bluff, AR	L 31–42	12,890	
*Non-conference game; ^{†}Homecoming; All times are in Central time
