= 2006 Grambling State Tigers football team =

American college football season

2006 Grambling State Tigers football
- Conference: Southwestern Athletic Conference
- West Division
- Record: 3–8 (3–6 SWAC)
- Head coach: Melvin Spears (3rd season)
- Home stadium: Eddie G. Robinson Memorial Stadium

2006 Southwestern Athletic Conference football standings
	Conf.			Overall
Team	W		L	W		L
East Division
Alabama A&M xy$	6	–	3	9	–	3
Jackson State	5	–	4	6	–	5
Alcorn State	5	–	4	6	–	5
Mississippi Valley State	5	–	4	6	–	5
Alabama State	5	–	4	5	–	6
West Division
Arkansas–Pine Bluff xy	7	–	2	8	–	4
Southern	4	–	5	5	–	6
Grambling State	3	–	6	3	–	8
Texas Southern	3	–	6	3	–	8
Prairie View A&M	2	–	7	3	–	7
Championship: Alabama A&M 22, Arkansas–Pine Bluff 13
$ – Conference champion; x – Division champion/co-champions; y – Championship game participant

The 2006 Grambling State Tigers football team represented Grambling State University as a member of the Southwestern Athletic Conference (SWAC) during the 2006 NCAA Division I FCS football season. Led by third-year head coach Melvin Spears, the Tigers compiled an overall record of 3–8 and a mark of 3–6 in conference play, and finished tied for third in the SWAC West Division.

== Schedule ==
Date	Opponent	Rank	Site	Result	Attendance	Source
September 2	vs. No. 13 Hampton*	No. 23	Legion Field; Birmingham, AL (MEAC/SWAC Challenge)	L 26–27 ^{OT}	19,175	
September 9	at Alabama A&M		Louis Crews Stadium; Normal, AL	L 27–30 ^{OT}	8,300	
September 16	at Houston*		Robertson Stadium; Houston, TX	L 22–42	27,302	
September 30	vs. Prairie View A&M		Cotton Bowl; Dallas, TX (rivalry)	W 53–7	48,220	
October 7	at Mississippi Valley State		Rice–Totten Field; Itta Bena, MS	W 28–25		
October 14	vs. Arkansas–Pine Bluff		War Memorial Stadium; Little Rock, AR (Delta Classic)	L 33–28	30,216	
October 21	Jackson State		Eddie G. Robinson Memorial Stadium; Grambling, LA	W 36–7	18,883	
October 28	at Texas Southern		Durley Field; Houston, TX	L 28–33		
November 4	Alabama State		Eddie G. Robinson Memorial Stadium; Grambling, LA	L 16–35		
November 25	vs. Southern		Louisiana Superdome; New Orleans, LA (Bayou Classic)	L 17–21	47,136	
December 2	Alcorn State		Eddie G. Robinson Memorial Stadium; Grambling, LA	L 14–21	2,383	
*Non-conference game; Rankings from The Sports Network Poll released prior to the game
