= 2004 Grambling State Tigers football team =

American college football season

2004 Grambling State Tigers football
- Conference: Southwestern Athletic Conference
- West Division
- Record: 6–5 (3–4 SWAC)
- Head coach: Melvin Spears (1st season)
- Defensive coordinator: Heishma Northern (2nd season)
- Home stadium: Eddie G. Robinson Memorial Stadium

2004 Southwestern Athletic Conference football standings
	Conf.			Overall
Team	W		L	W		L
East
No. 20 Alabama State xy$	6	–	1	10	–	2
Alabama A&M	5	–	2	7	–	4
Alcorn State	4	–	3	7	–	4
Jackson State	3	–	4	4	–	7
Mississippi Valley State	1	–	6	3	–	8
West
Southern xy	6	–	1	8	–	4
Arkansas–Pine Bluff	5	–	2	6	–	3
Grambling State	3	–	4	6	–	5
Prairie View A&M	1	–	6	3	–	8
Texas Southern	0	–	7	0	–	11
Championship: Alabama State 40, Southern 35
$ – Conference champion; x – Division champion/co-champions; y – Championship game participant; Rankings from The Sports Network Poll

The 2004 Grambling State Tigers football team represented Grambling State University as a member of the Southwestern Athletic Conference (SWAC) during the 2004 NCAA Division I-AA football season. Led by first-year head coach Melvin Spears, the Tigers compiled an overall record of 6–5 and a mark of 3–4 in conference play, and finished third in the SWAC West Division.

== Schedule ==
Date	Opponent	Rank	Site	Result	Attendance	Source
September 4	Alcorn State	No. 17	Eddie G. Robinson Memorial Stadium; Grambling, LA	L 23–34		
September 11	at Alabama A&M		Louis Crews Stadium; Normal, AL	L 9–21	10,235	
September 18	vs. Bethune–Cookman*		Paul Brown Stadium; Cincinnati, OH (P&G Ohio Classic)	W 24–23	35,608	
October 2	vs. Prairie View A&M		Cotton Bowl; Dallas, TX (rivalry)	W 53–32	61,642	
October 9	at Mississippi Valley State		Rice–Totten Field; Itta Bena, MS	W 34–26		
October 16	Arkansas–Pine Bluff		Eddie G. Robinson Memorial Stadium; Grambling, LA	L 22–41		
October 23	Jackson State		Eddie G. Robinson Memorial Stadium; Grambling, LA	L 23–33	15,085	
October 30	at Texas Southern		Reliant Astrodome; Houston, TX	W 28–10		
November 6	No. 25 Alabama State		Eddie G. Robinson Memorial Stadium; Grambling, LA	L 23–37		
November 13	at Savannah State*		Ted Wright Stadium; Savannah, GA	W 31–26	4,156	
November 27	vs. No. 20 Southern		Louisiana Superdome; New Orleans, LA (Bayou Classic)	W 24–13	68,911	
*Non-conference game; Rankings from The Sports Network Poll released prior to the game
