= 2004 Samford Bulldogs football team =

American college football season

2004 Samford Bulldogs football
- Conference: Ohio Valley Conference
- Record: 4–7 (3–5 OVC)
- Head coach: Bill Gray (4th season)
- Offensive coordinator: Bill Gray (4th season)
- Defensive coordinator: Mike O'Toole (5th season)
- Home stadium: Seibert Stadium

2004 Ohio Valley Conference football standings
	Conf.			Overall
Team	W		L	W		L
No. 14 Jacksonville State $^	7	–	1	9	–	2
Murray State	6	–	2	7	–	4
Eastern Kentucky	6	–	2	6	–	5
Eastern Illinois	4	–	4	5	–	6
Tennessee Tech	3	–	4	6	–	5
Samford	3	–	5	4	–	7
Southeast Missouri State	3	–	5	3	–	8
Tennessee State	2	–	5	4	–	7
Tennessee–Martin	1	–	7	2	–	9
$ – Conference champion; ^ – NCAA Division I-AA playoff participant; Rankings from The Sports Network poll

The 2004 Samford Bulldogs football team represented Samford University as a member of the Ohio Valley Conference (OVC) during the 2004 NCAA Division I-AA football season. Led by fourth-year head coach Bill Gray, the Bulldogs compiled an overall record of 4–7, with a mark of 3–5 in conference play, and finished tied for sixth in the OVC. The team played home games at Seibert Stadium in Homewood, Alabama.

== Schedule ==
Date	Time	Opponent	Site	Result	Attendance	Source
August 28	6:00 p.m.	West Alabama*	Seibert Stadium; Homewood, AL	W 34–20	9,542	
September 4	12:00 p.m.	at Georgia Tech*	Bobby Dodd Stadium; Atlanta, GA	L 7–28	43,100	
September 11	6:00 p.m.	No. 5 Furman*	Seibert Stadium; Homewood, AL	L 10–45	9,053	
September 25	6:00 p.m.	at Southeast Missouri State	Houck Stadium; Cape Girardeau, MO	L 48–51 ^{4OT}	7,112	
October 2	6:00 p.m.	Eastern Kentucky	Seibert Stadium; Homewood, AL	L 36–39 ^{2OT}	6,736	
October 9	3:00 p.m.	at Murray State	Roy Stewart Stadium; Murray, KY	L 21–24	6,451	
October 16	1:00 p.m.	Tennessee–Martin	Seibert Stadium; Homewood, AL	W 34–20	3,716	
October 23	2:30 p.m.	at Tennessee State	The Coliseum; Nashville, TN	W 42–36 ^{OT}	5,023	
October 30	2:00 p.m.	Tennessee Tech	Seibert Stadium; Homewood, AL	W 20–17	6,842	
November 6	4:00 p.m.	at No. 15 Jacksonville State	Paul Snow Stadium; Jacksonville, AL (rivalry)	L 18–51	13,013	
November 20	1:00 p.m.	Eastern Illinois	Seibert Stadium; Homewood, AL	L 14–28	2,497	
*Non-conference game; Rankings from The Sports Network Poll released prior to the game; All times are in Central time
