= 2004 Gardner–Webb Runnin' Bulldogs football team =

American college football season

2004 Gardner–Webb Runnin' Bulldogs football
- Conference: Big South Conference
- Record: 5–6 (2–2 Big South)
- Head coach: Steve Patton (8th season)
- Home stadium: Ernest W. Spangler Stadium

2004 Big South Conference football standings
	Conf.			Overall
Team	W		L	W		L
No. 24 Coastal Carolina $	4	–	0	10	–	1
Liberty	3	–	1	6	–	5
Gardner–Webb	2	–	2	5	–	6
Charleston Southern	1	–	3	5	–	5
VMI	0	–	4	0	–	11
$ – Conference champion; Rankings from The Sports Network poll

The 2004 Gardner–Webb Runnin' Bulldogs football team represented Gardner–Webb University as a member of the Big South Conference during the 2004 NCAA Division I-AA football season. Led by Steve Patton in his eighth-year as head coach, the Runnin' Bulldogs compiled an overall record of 5–6 with a mark of 2–2 in conference play, finishing in fourth place in the Big South. Gardner–Webb played home games at Ernest W. Spangler Stadium in Boiling Springs, North Carolina.

== Schedule ==
Date	Time	Opponent	Site	Result	Attendance	Source
September 4	8:00 pm	at Tennessee Tech*	Tucker Stadium; Cookeville, TN	L 26–32	8,468	
September 11	6:00 pm	at Morgan State*	Hughes Stadium; Baltimore, MD	W 56–49	4,156	
September 18		No. 4 Furman*	Ernest W. Spangler Stadium; Boiling Springs, NC	L 6–34	6,009	
September 25	6:00 pm	No. 25 Western Carolina*	Ernest W. Spangler Stadium; Boiling Springs, NC	W 26–20 ^{OT}	6,311	
October 2	7:00 pm	at Liberty	Williams Stadium; Lynchburg, VA	L 9–17	11,719	
October 9		at No. 25 Hampton*	Armstrong Stadium; Hampton, VA	L 25–48	4,021	
October 23		VMI	Ernest W. Spangler Stadium; Boiling Springs, NC	W 28–17	3,629	
October 30	1:30 pm	Coastal Carolina	Ernest W. Spangler Stadium; Boiling Springs, NC	L 19–31	6,486	
November 6	12:30 pm	at No. 10 Wofford*	Gibbs Stadium; Spartanburg, SC	L 17–49	6,648	
November 13	12:00 pm	at Charleston Southern	Buccaneer Field; Charleston, SC	W 18–0	2,112	
November 20	1:30 pm	Southeastern Louisiana*	Ernest W. Spangler Stadium; Boiling Springs, NC	W 52–34	3,841	
*Non-conference game; Rankings from The Sports Network Poll released prior to the game; All times are in Eastern time
