= 2004 Norfolk State Spartans football team =

American college football season

2004 Norfolk State Spartans football
- Conference: Mid-Eastern Athletic Conference
- Record: 1–8 (1–6 MEAC)
- Head coach: Willie Gillus (2nd season)
- Home stadium: William "Dick" Price Stadium

2004 Mid-Eastern Athletic Conference football standings
| | Conf. | | | Overall |
| Team | W | | L | W | | L |
|---|---|---|---|---|---|---|
| No. 12 Hampton +^ | 6 | – | 1 | 10 | – | 2 |
| No. 22 South Carolina State + | 6 | – | 1 | 9 | – | 2 |
| Bethune–Cookman | 4 | – | 3 | 6 | – | 4 |
| Delaware State | 4 | – | 3 | 4 | – | 7 |
| Howard | 3 | – | 4 | 6 | – | 5 |
| Morgan State | 3 | – | 4 | 5 | – | 6 |
| North Carolina A&T | 1 | – | 6 | 3 | – | 8 |
| Norfolk State | 1 | – | 6 | 1 | – | 8 |
+ – Conference co-champions; ^ – NCAA Division I-AA playoff participant; Rankings from The Sports Network poll

The 2004 Norfolk State Spartans football team represented Norfolk State University as a member of the Mid-Eastern Athletic Conference (MEAC) during the 2004 NCAA Division I-AA football season. Led by second-year head coach Willie Gillus, the Spartans compiled an overall record of 1–8, with a conference record of 1–6, and finished tied for seventh in the MEAC.

== Schedule ==
| Date | Opponent | Site | Result | Attendance | Source |
|---|---|---|---|---|---|
| September 4 | Virginia State* | William "Dick" Price Stadium; Norfolk, VA | L 7–17 | 14,963 | |
| September 11 | Savannah State* | William "Dick" Price Stadium; Norfolk, VA | L 34–41 ^{2OT} | | |
| September 28 | at Bethune–Cookman | Municipal Stadium; Daytona Beach, FL | L 3–43 | 4,225 | |
| October 2 | North Carolina A&T | William "Dick" Price Stadium; Norfolk, VA | W 27–14 | | |
| October 9 | South Carolina State | William "Dick" Price Stadium; Norfolk, VA | L 14–39 | | |
| October 16 | at No. 22 Hampton | Armstrong Stadium; Hampton, VA (rivalry) | L 10–58 | 14,690 | |
| October 30 | at Howard | William H. Greene Stadium; Washington, DC | L 17–35 | 12,804 | |
| November 6 | Morgan State | William "Dick" Price Stadium; Norfolk, VA | L 28–58 | 16,488 | |
| November 13 | Delaware State | William "Dick" Price Stadium; Norfolk, VA | L 28–33 | 2,060 | |
*Non-conference game; Rankings from The Sports Network Poll released prior to the game
