= 2004 Alcorn State Braves football team =

American college football season

2004 Alcorn State Braves football
- Conference: Southwestern Athletic Conference
- East Division
- Record: 7–4 (5–3 SWAC)
- Head coach: Johnny Thomas (7th season)
- Offensive coordinator: John McKenzie (5th season)
- Home stadium: Jack Spinks Stadium

2004 Southwestern Athletic Conference football standings
	Conf.			Overall
Team	W		L	W		L
East
No. 20 Alabama State xy$	6	–	1	10	–	2
Alabama A&M	5	–	2	7	–	4
Alcorn State	4	–	3	7	–	4
Jackson State	3	–	4	4	–	7
Mississippi Valley State	1	–	6	3	–	8
West
Southern xy	6	–	1	8	–	4
Arkansas–Pine Bluff	5	–	2	6	–	3
Grambling State	3	–	4	6	–	5
Prairie View A&M	1	–	6	3	–	8
Texas Southern	0	–	7	0	–	11
Championship: Alabama State 40, Southern 35
$ – Conference champion; x – Division champion/co-champions; y – Championship game participant; Rankings from The Sports Network Poll

The 2004 Alcorn State Braves football team represented Alcorn State University as a member of the Southwestern Athletic Conference (SWAC) during the 2004 NCAA Division I-AA football season. Led by seventh-year head coach Johnny Thomas, the Braves compiled an overall record of 7–4, with a conference record of 5–3, and finished third in the SWAC East Division.

== Schedule ==
Date	Opponent	Site	Result	Attendance	Source
September 4	at No. 17 Grambling State	Eddie G. Robinson Memorial Stadium; Grambling, LA	W 34–23		
September 11	North Carolina A&T*	Jack Spinks Stadium; Lorman, MS	W 15–13	14,911	
September 18	vs. Howard*	FedExField; Landover, MD (Prince George's Classic)	L 10–17		
September 25	Alabama State	Jack Spinks Stadium; Lorman, MS	L 8–41		
October 9	at Prairie View A&M	Edward L. Blackshear Field; Prairie View, TX	W 26–15		
October 16	Texas Southern	Jack Spinks Stadium; Lorman, MS	W 30–0		
October 23	Southern	Jack Spinks Stadium; Lorman, MS	L 20–23		
October 30	at Southeastern Louisiana*	Strawberry Stadium; Hammond, LA	W 33–27	9,137	
November 6	at Mississippi Valley State	Rice–Totten Stadium; Itta Bena, MS	W 31–30		
November 13	at Alabama A&M	Louis Crews Stadium; Normal, AL	L 21–27		
November 20	at Jackson State	Mississippi Veterans Memorial Stadium; Jackson, MS (Capital City Classic)	W 16–14		
*Non-conference game; Rankings from The Sports Network Poll released prior to the game
