= 2004 VMI Keydets football team =

American college football season

2004 VMI Keydets football
- Conference: Big South Conference
- Record: 0–11 (0–4 Big South)
- Head coach: Cal McCombs (6th season)
- Offensive coordinator: Will McCombs (1st season)
- Defensive coordinator: Johnny Burnett (3rd season)
- Home stadium: Alumni Memorial Field

2004 Big South Conference football standings
| | Conf. | | | Overall |
| Team | W | | L | W | | L |
|---|---|---|---|---|---|---|
| No. 24 Coastal Carolina $ | 4 | – | 0 | 10 | – | 1 |
| Liberty | 3 | – | 1 | 6 | – | 5 |
| Gardner–Webb | 2 | – | 2 | 5 | – | 6 |
| Charleston Southern | 1 | – | 3 | 5 | – | 5 |
| VMI | 0 | – | 4 | 0 | – | 11 |
$ – Conference champion; Rankings from The Sports Network poll

The 2004 VMI Keydets football team represented the Virginia Military Institute during the 2004 NCAA Division I-AA football season. It was the Keydets' 114th year of football, and their 2nd season in the Big South Conference.

VMI went 0–11 on the year, failing to win a game in a season for only the third time in program history, and the first time since 1997 under Ted Cain.

== Schedule ==
| Date | Opponent | Site | Result | Attendance | Source |
|---|---|---|---|---|---|
| September 4 | at Ohio* | Peden Stadium; Athens, OH | L 14–42 | 17,527 | |
| September 11 | Richmond* | Alumni Memorial Field; Lexington, VA | L 7–34 | 6,245 | |
| September 18 | Tennessee Tech*^{†} | Alumni Memorial Field; Lexington, VA | L 10–16 | 4,835 | |
| September 25 | at William & Mary* | Zable Stadium; Williamsburg, VA (rivalry) | L 6–42 | 8,101 | |
| October 2 | at Charleston Southern | Buccaneer Field; North Charleston, SC | L 24–25 | 2,181 | |
| October 9 | at Georgetown* | Multi-Sport Field; Washington, DC | L 0–21 | 2,847 | |
| October 16 | Coastal Carolina | Alumni Memorial Field; Lexington, VA | L 14–21 | 6,419 | |
| October 23 | at Gardner–Webb | Ernest W. Spangler Stadium; Boiling Springs, NC | L 17–28 | 3,629 | |
| October 30 | at No. 9 James Madison* | Bridgeforth Stadium; Harrisonburg, VA | L 10–41 | 15,312 | |
| November 6 | Liberty | Alumni Memorial Field; Lexington, VA | L 17–38 | 4,640 | |
| November 20 | Wofford* | Alumni Memorial Field; Lexington, VA | L 18–19 | 4,317 | |
*Non-conference game; ^{†}Homecoming; Rankings from The Sports Network Poll released prior to the game
