= 2004 North Carolina A&T Aggies football team =

American college football season

2004 North Carolina A&T Aggies football
- Conference: Mid-Eastern Athletic Conference
- Record: 3–8 (1–6 MEAC)
- Head coach: George Small (2nd season)
- Home stadium: Aggie Stadium

2004 Mid-Eastern Athletic Conference football standings
	Conf.			Overall
Team	W		L	W		L
No. 12 Hampton +^	6	–	1	10	–	2
No. 22 South Carolina State +	6	–	1	9	–	2
Bethune–Cookman	4	–	3	6	–	4
Delaware State	4	–	3	4	–	7
Howard	3	–	4	6	–	5
Morgan State	3	–	4	5	–	6
North Carolina A&T	1	–	6	3	–	8
Norfolk State	1	–	6	1	–	8
+ – Conference co-champions; ^ – NCAA Division I-AA playoff participant; Rankings from The Sports Network poll

The 2004 North Carolina A&T Aggies football team represented North Carolina A&T State University as a member of the Mid-Eastern Athletic Conference (MEAC) during the 2004 NCAA Division I-AA football season. Led by second-year head coach George Small, the Aggies compiled an overall record of 3–8, with a mark of 1–6 in conference play, and finished tied for seventh in the MEAC.

== Schedule ==
Date	Opponent	Site	Result	Attendance	Source
September 5	vs. North Carolina Central*	Carter–Finley Stadium; Raleigh, NC (rivalry)	W 16–15	27,852	
September 11	at Alcorn State*	Jack Spinks Stadium; Lorman, MS	L 13–15	14,911	
September 18	at Wake Forest*	Groves Stadium; Winston-Salem, NC	L 3–42	27,893	
September 25	Elon*	Aggie Stadium; Greensboro, NC	W 19–17	8,250	
October 2	at Norfolk State	William "Dick" Price Stadium; Norfolk, VA	L 14–27		
October 9	Morgan State	Aggie Stadium; Greensboro, NC	L 26–28	21,940	
October 16	at Delaware State	Alumni Stadium; Dover, DE	L 6–15	2,816	
October 23	Howard	Aggie Stadium; Greensboro, NC	W 14–13 ^{OT}	12,220	
October 30	Bethune–Cookman	Aggie Stadium; Greensboro, NC	L 17–45	14,528	
November 13	at No. 13 Hampton	Armstrong Stadium; Hampton, VA	L 24–51	5,411	
November 20	vs. No. 23 South Carolina State	American Legion Memorial Stadium; Charlotte, NC (rivalry)	L 28–34	16,824	
*Non-conference game; Rankings from The Sports Network Poll released prior to the game
