= 2006 Southern Jaguars football team =

American college football season

2006 Southern Jaguars football
- Conference: Southwestern Athletic Conference
- West Division
- Record: 5–6 (4–5 SWAC)
- Head coach: Pete Richardson (14th season)
- Defensive coordinator: Terrence Graves (3rd season)
- Home stadium: A. W. Mumford Stadium

2006 Southwestern Athletic Conference football standings
	Conf.			Overall
Team	W		L	W		L
East Division
Alabama A&M xy$	6	–	3	9	–	3
Jackson State	5	–	4	6	–	5
Alcorn State	5	–	4	6	–	5
Mississippi Valley State	5	–	4	6	–	5
Alabama State	5	–	4	5	–	6
West Division
Arkansas–Pine Bluff xy	7	–	2	8	–	4
Southern	4	–	5	5	–	6
Grambling State	3	–	6	3	–	8
Texas Southern	3	–	6	3	–	8
Prairie View A&M	2	–	7	3	–	7
Championship: Alabama A&M 22, Arkansas–Pine Bluff 13
$ – Conference champion; x – Division champion/co-champions; y – Championship game participant

The 2006 Southern Jaguars football team represented Southern University as a member of the Southwestern Athletic Conference (SWAC) during the 2006 NCAA Division I FCS football season. Led by 14th-year head coach Pete Richardson, the Jaguars compiled an overall record of 5–6, with a conference record of 4–5, and finished and finished second in the SWAC West Division.

== Schedule ==
Date	Opponent	Site	Result	Attendance	Source
September 2	vs. Bethune–Cookman*	Alltel Stadium; Jacksonville, FL (Gateway Classic)	W 30–29	23,241	
September 9	Mississippi Valley State	A. W. Mumford Stadium; Baton Rouge, LA	W 31–14		
September 16	at Prairie View A&M	Tully Stadium; Houston, TX	L 23–26 ^{OT}		
September 23	North Carolina Central*	A. W. Mumford Stadium; Baton Rouge, LA	L 20–27	12,845	
September 30	Alabama State	A. W. Mumford Stadium; Baton Rouge, LA	W 38–20		
October 7	at Alabama A&M	Louis Crews Stadium; Normal, AL	L 21–28		
October 14	at Jackson State	Mississippi Veterans Memorial Stadium; Jackson, MS (rivalry)	L 28–31 ^{2OT}		
October 21	at Alcorn State	Jack Spinks Stadium; Lorman, MS	L 10–26		
November 4	Texas Southern	A. W. Mumford Stadium; Baton Rouge, LA	W 34–17	14,116	
November 11	Arkansas–Pine Bluff	A. W. Mumford Stadium; Baton Rouge, LA	L 20–45		
November 25	vs. Grambling State	Louisiana Superdome; New Orleans, LA (Bayou Classic)	W 21–17	47,136	
*Non-conference game
