= John Zernhelt =

American football player, coach, and scout (born 1954)

Biographical details
- Born: January 4, 1954 (age 72); Pottsville, Pennsylvania, U.S.

Playing career
- 1974–1977: Maryland
- Position: Offensive lineman

Coaching career (HC unless noted)
- 1978–1980: Ferrum (OL)
- 1981: Marshall (OL)
- 1982–1986: East Carolina (OL)
- 1987–1991: Maryland (OL)
- 1992–1993: Rice (OL)
- 1994: Duke (OL)
- 1995: Duke (OC/OL)
- 1996–1998: South Carolina (OL)
- 1999–2002: James Madison (OC/OL)
- 2003: The Citadel (OC)
- 2004: The Citadel
- 2005: New York Jets (TE)
- 2006–2012: Tennessee Titans (TE)
- 2022–2024: Ferrum (off. analyst)

Head coaching record
- Overall: 3–7

John Zernhelt (born January 4, 1954) is an American football coach. Zernhelt served as the head football coach at The Citadel for one season, in 2004, compiling a record of 3–7. Zernhelt was a scout for the Los Angeles Rams of the National Football League (NFL) for six years.

== Head coaching record ==
Year	Team	Overall	Conference	Standing	Bowl/playoffs
The Citadel Bulldogs (Southern Conference) (2004)
2004	The Citadel	3–7	2–5	T–5th	
The Citadel:		3–7	2–5		
Total:		3–7			
