= 2004 Arkansas–Pine Bluff Golden Lions football team =

American college football season

2004 Arkansas–Pine Bluff Golden Lions football
- Conference: Southwestern Athletic Conference
- West Division
- Record: 6–3 (5–2 SWAC)
- Head coach: Mo Forte (1st season)
- Home stadium: Golden Lion Stadium

2004 Southwestern Athletic Conference football standings
	Conf.			Overall
Team	W		L	W		L
East
No. 20 Alabama State xy$	6	–	1	10	–	2
Alabama A&M	5	–	2	7	–	4
Alcorn State	4	–	3	7	–	4
Jackson State	3	–	4	4	–	7
Mississippi Valley State	1	–	6	3	–	8
West
Southern xy	6	–	1	8	–	4
Arkansas–Pine Bluff	5	–	2	6	–	3
Grambling State	3	–	4	6	–	5
Prairie View A&M	1	–	6	3	–	8
Texas Southern	0	–	7	0	–	11
Championship: Alabama State 40, Southern 35
$ – Conference champion; x – Division champion/co-champions; y – Championship game participant; Rankings from The Sports Network Poll

The 2004 Arkansas–Pine Bluff Golden Lions football team represented the University of Arkansas at Pine Bluff as a member of the Southwestern Athletic Conference (SWAC) during the 2004 NCAA Division I-AA football season. Led by first-year head coach Mo Forte, the Golden Lions compiled an overall record of 6–3, with a mark of 5–2 in conference play, and finished second in the SWAC West Division.

== Schedule ==
Date	Opponent	Site	Result	Attendance	Source
September 4	at Mississippi Valley State	Rice–Totten Stadium; Itta Bena, MS	W 49–14		
September 11	Bethune–Cookman*	Golden Lion Stadium; Pine Bluff, AR	L 14–27		
September 25	vs. Alabama A&M	Edward Jones Dome; St. Louis, MO (Gateway Classic)	W 24–10		
October 2	Paul Quinn*	Golden Lion Stadium; Pine Bluff, AR	W 48–34		
October 9	vs. Texas Southern	Soldier Field; Chicago, IL (Chicago Football Classic)	W 42–0		
October 16	at Grambling State	Eddie G. Robinson Memorial Stadium; Grambling, LA	W 41–22		
October 30	Jackson State	Golden Lion Stadium; Pine Bluff, AR	L 35–42	17,100	
November 6	Prairie View A&M	Golden Lion Stadium; Pine Bluff, AR	W 24–23		
December 4	at No. 20 Alabama State	Cramton Bowl; Montgomery, AL	L 14–21		
*Non-conference game; Rankings from The Sports Network Poll released prior to the game
