= 2004 Hampton Pirates football team =

American college football season

2004 Hampton Pirates football

Black college national champion MEAC co-champion

NCAA Division I-AA First Round, L 35–42 vs. William & Mary
- Conference: Mid-Eastern Athletic Conference

Ranking
- Sports Network: No. 12
- Record: 10–2 (6–1 MEAC)
- Head coach: Joe Taylor (13th season)
- Offensive coordinator: Fred Kaiss (4th season)
- Defensive coordinator: Karl Morgan (3rd season)
- Home stadium: Armstrong Stadium

2004 Mid-Eastern Athletic Conference football standings
	Conf.			Overall
Team	W		L	W		L
No. 12 Hampton +^	6	–	1	10	–	2
No. 22 South Carolina State +	6	–	1	9	–	2
Bethune–Cookman	4	–	3	6	–	4
Delaware State	4	–	3	4	–	7
Howard	3	–	4	6	–	5
Morgan State	3	–	4	5	–	6
North Carolina A&T	1	–	6	3	–	8
Norfolk State	1	–	6	1	–	8
+ – Conference co-champions; ^ – NCAA Division I-AA playoff participant; Rankings from The Sports Network poll

The 2004 Hampton Pirates football team represented Hampton University as a member of the Mid-Eastern Athletic Conference (MEAC) during the 2004 NCAA Division I-AA football season. Led by 13th-year head coach Joe Taylor, the Pirates compiled an overall record of 10–2, with a mark of 6–1 in conference play, and finished as MEAC co-champion. Hampton finished their season with a loss against William & Mary in the Division I-AA playoffs. At the conclusion of the season, the Pirates were also recognized as black college national champion.

== Schedule ==
Date	Opponent	Rank	Site	Result	Attendance	Source
September 4	Jackson State*		Armstrong Stadium; Hampton, VA	W 38–19	7,553	
September 11	Howard		Armstrong Stadium; Hampton, VA (rivalry)	W 47–14	17,520	
September 18	No. 16 Western Illinois*		Armstrong Stadium; Hampton, VA	W 40–20	1,705	
September 25	vs. Morgan State	No. 20	Giants Stadium; East Rutherford, NJ (Urban League Classic)	W 49–37	42,682	
October 2	at Delaware State	No. 17	Alumni Stadium; Dover, DE	L 23–28	1,972	
October 9	Gardner–Webb*	No. 25	Armstrong Stadium; Hampton, VA	W 48–25	4,021	
October 16	Norfolk State	No. 22	Armstrong Stadium; Hampton, VA (rivalry)	W 58–10	14,690	
October 23	at No. 20 South Carolina State	No. 17	Oliver C. Dawson Stadium; Orangeburg, SC	W 52–36	17,127	
November 6	Bethune–Cookman	No. 14	Armstrong Stadium; Hampton, VA	W 24–17	19,322	
November 13	North Carolina A&T	No. 13	Armstrong Stadium; Hampton, VA	W 51–24	5,411	
November 20	at Savannah State*	No. 12	Ted Wright Stadium; Savannah, GA	W 58–7		
November 27	at No. 6 William & Mary*	No. 11	Zable Stadium; Williamsburg, VA (NCAA Division I-AA First Round)	L 35–42	5,576	
*Non-conference game; Rankings from The Sports Network Poll released prior to the game
