= Willie Gillus =

American gridiron football player and coach (born 1963)

No. 5
- Position: Quarterback

Personal information
- Born: September 1, 1963 (age 63); Emporia, Virginia, U.S.
- Listed height: 6 ft 4 in (1.93 m)
- Listed weight: 215 lb (98 kg)

Career information
- College: Norfolk State
- NFL draft: 1986: undrafted

Career history
- Green Bay Packers (1986–1987); BC Lions (1988); Ottawa Rough Riders (1989); Toronto Argonauts (1990–1991); Kansas City Chiefs (1992)*
- * Offseason or practice squad member only

Awards and highlights
- Grey Cup champion (1991)
- Stats at Pro Football Reference

Willie Harden Gillus (born September 1, 1963) is an American former gridiron football player and coach. He played professionally as a quarterback in the National Football League (NFL) and the Canadian Football League (CFL). Gillus served as the head football coach at Norfolk State University from 2003 to 2004.

== Playing career ==
Gillus played college football at Norfolk State University in Norfolk, Virginia. As a quarterback, he set various passing records in the history of the football program, and led the Spartans to their only Division II football playoff appearance in 1984.

Gillus was a member of the Green Bay Packers during the 1987 NFL season, and then played five seasons in the Canadian Football League (CFL).

== Coaching career ==
After his playing career was over, Gillus went into coaching in high school football in Surry County, Virginia, during the late 1990s. He later became head football coach at his alma mater, for two years (2003 and 2004), before serving one year as the quarterbacks and running backs coach for the Winnipeg Blue Bombers of the CFL in 2005. Gillus was the assistant head coach and quarterbacks coach at Elizabeth City State University in Elizabeth City, North Carolina.

== Head coaching record ==
Year	Team	Overall	Conference	Standing	Bowl/playoffs
Norfolk State Spartans (Mid-Eastern Athletic Conference) (2003–2004)
2003	Norfolk State	1–11	0–8	9th	
2004	Norfolk State	1–8	1–6	T–7th	
Norfolk State:		2–19	1–14		
Total:		2–19			
