= 2004 Morgan State Bears football team =

American college football season

2004 Morgan State Bears football
- Conference: Mid-Eastern Athletic Conference
- Record: 5–6 (3–4 MEAC)
- Head coach: Donald Hill-Eley (3rd season)
- Home stadium: Hughes Stadium

2004 Mid-Eastern Athletic Conference football standings
	Conf.			Overall
Team	W		L	W		L
No. 12 Hampton +^	6	–	1	10	–	2
No. 22 South Carolina State +	6	–	1	9	–	2
Bethune–Cookman	4	–	3	6	–	4
Delaware State	4	–	3	4	–	7
Howard	3	–	4	6	–	5
Morgan State	3	–	4	5	–	6
North Carolina A&T	1	–	6	3	–	8
Norfolk State	1	–	6	1	–	8
+ – Conference co-champions; ^ – NCAA Division I-AA playoff participant; Rankings from The Sports Network poll

The 2004 Morgan State Bears football team represented Morgan State University as a member of the Mid-Eastern Athletic Conference (MEAC) during the 2004 NCAA Division I-AA football season. Led by third-year head coach Donald Hill-Eley, the Bears compiled an overall record of 5–6, with a mark of 3–4 in conference play, and finished tied for fifth in the MEAC.

== Schedule ==
Date	Opponent	Site	Result	Attendance	Source
September 4	Bowie State*	Hughes Stadium; Baltimore, MD	W 41–35	9,571	
September 11	Gardner–Webb*	Hughes Stadium; Baltimore, MD	L 49–56	4,156	
September 18	at San Jose State*	Spartan Stadium; San Jose, CA	L 28–47	10,411	
September 25	vs. No. 20 Hampton	Giants Stadium; East Rutherford, NJ (Urban League Classic)	L 37–49	42,682	
October 2	Bethune–Cookman	Hughes Stadium; Baltimore, MD	L 21–51		
October 9	at North Carolina A&T	Aggie Stadium; Greensboro, NC	W 28–26	21,940	
October 16	at Howard	William H. Greene Stadium; Washington, DC (rivalry)	L 35–42 ^{OT}	9,804	
October 23	Delaware State	Hughes Stadium; Baltimore, MD	W 34–30	14,479	
November 6	at Norfolk State	William "Dick" Price Stadium; Norfolk, VA	W 58–28	16,488	
November 13	at South Carolina State	Oliver C. Dawson Stadium; Orangeburg, SC	L 35–38 ^{OT}	5,079	
November 20	at Texas Southern*	Reliant Astrodome; Houston, TX	W 37–21		
*Non-conference game; Rankings from The Sports Network Poll released prior to the game
