= Anthony Jones (American football) =

American football player and coach (born 1960)

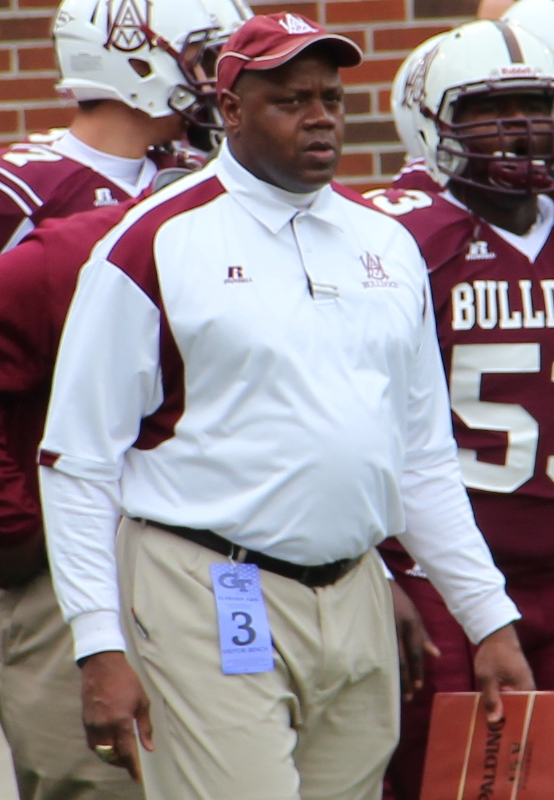
- Jones in 2013

Biographical details
- Born: May 16, 1960 (age 66); Baltimore, Maryland, U.S.

Playing career
- 1981–1983: Wichita State
- 1984–1988: Washington Redskins
- 1988: San Diego Chargers
- Position: Tight end

Coaching career (HC unless noted)
- 1999–2001: Morehouse
- 2002–2013: Alabama A&M
- 2014–2015: Arkansas–Pine Bluff (OC/QB)
- 2018–2021: Elizabeth City State

Head coaching record
- Overall: 107–93

Accomplishments and honors

Championships
- 1 SWAC (2006); 5 SWAC East Division (2002, 2005, 2006, 2009, 2011)

Awards
- 2× SIAC Coach of the Year (2000, 2001); SWAC Coach of the Year (2006)

Anthony Andrew Jones (born May 16, 1960) is an American football coach and former player. He was most recently the head football coach at Elizabeth City State University, a position he has held from 2018 to 2021. He served as head coach at Morehouse College from 1999 to 2001, and Alabama Agricultural and Mechanical University from 2002 to 2013,. Jones played eight seasons as a tight end in the National Football League (NFL) for the Washington Redskins and San Diego Chargers during the 1980s. He was a member of the Redskins' 1987 Super Bowl championship team.

== Playing career ==
Jones initially attended the University of Maryland Eastern Shore but then transferred to Wichita State University where he played for head coach Willie Jeffries. He earned several honors as a tight end, including the Ben Hustle Award (1981) and All-Missouri Valley Conference recognition (1983). Following his senior season with the Shockers, Jones was selected in the eleventh round of the 1984 NFL draft by the Washington Redskins. He went on to play eight seasons for the team, helping to win a Super Bowl championship in 1987. The Redskins traded him to the San Diego Chargers during the 1988 season, but Jones was forced to retire after suffering a knee injury before the next season.

== Coaching career ==
=== Morehouse ===
Jones's first head coaching job was at Morehouse College in Atlanta, Georgia, where he spent four years. After serving as the offensive coordinator and assistant head coach in his first year with the Maroon Tigers, he was promoted to head coach in 1999. After going 2–8 in his first season, Jones led the Tigers to the first back-to-back eight-win seasons in school history. He was named SIAC Coach of the year both times. The 2000 campaign (8-3) qualified him and the Tigers as the second-most improved team in NCAA Division II.

Following his second consecutive eight-win season (8-2), Jones was one of three finalists for the 2001 Eddie Robinson Coach of the year Award along with Doug Williams (Grambling State) and Rick Comegy (Tuskegee).

=== Alabama A&M ===
In 2006, Jones led the Bulldogs to their first SWAC title and tied the school record with nine victories. The Bulldogs posted back-to-back nine-win seasons in 2005 and 2006. The 2006 SWAC Coach of the year has led A&M to four SWAC title games in nine seasons and enters the 2011 campaign with an 82–54 career record.

With his 79–47 record while at Alabama A&M, Jones' 79 wins at A&M rank second all-time behind legendary A&M coach Louis Crews, who won 93 games at A&M. In 2005, Jones led the Bulldogs to their second SWAC East Championship under his reign, and a 9–3 record. The nine wins also earned Jones a milestone victory in the regular season finale, a 31–16 win at Prairie View served as the 50th win in Jones' career.

After the Bulldogs posted tremendous 8-4 records in each of his first two seasons in 2002 and 2003, the team from the Rocket City capped off another outstanding season in 2004 with a 7–4 mark. With a 21–7 victory in the Magic City Classic Jones is 7–2 in his nine seasons against in-state rival Alabama State. The 2005, 2006, 2007 and 2009 teams also captured the John Merritt Classic title, defeating Tennessee State in the season-opener. Alabama A&M remains the only visiting team to have beaten Tennessee State in the John Merritt Classic's history.

Three times, Jones has led A&M to six-game winning streaks in his tenure. After two early losses in 2002, Jones' Bulldogs won six straight and eight of nine to finish the regular season. The Bulldogs captured the SWAC East (6-1). This led to A&M's second berth in the SWAC championship in three years. In 2005, after a disappointing Homecoming loss to Texas Southern, the Bulldogs regrouped and won six straight games to finish the regular season en route to another SWAC East title and a berth in the SWAC Championship game. The 2009 season saw three two game win streaks and victories over Jackson State (13-5) and Mississippi Valley (17-12) in the final two contest of the season to earn Jones his fourth SWAC East championship and title game appearance.

Jones has led A&M to five division championships in his 11 years as head coach - the most successful run in the history of the SWAC championship game.

On December 1, 2013, it was announced that Jones would not return as Alabama A&M head coach. Jones served as Alabama A&M football coach for 12 seasons.

=== Elizabeth City State ===
On April 2, 2018, Jones was named as the head football coach for the Elizabeth City State University Vikings. ECSU competes in the Central Intercollegiate Athletic Association (CIAA).

== Family ==
Jones' son Julian was a top football recruit out of Hazel Green High School in Alabama. The 16-year-old junior committed suicide on October 6, 2014. Several Division I college football programs recruited him and two schools (Mississippi and South Carolina) had already extended scholarship offers to him.

== Head coaching record ==
Year	Team	Overall	Conference	Standing	Bowl/playoffs
Morehouse Maroon Tigers (Southern Intercollegiate Athletic Conference) (1999–2001)
1999	Morehouse	2–8	1–5	T–7th	
2000	Morehouse	8–3	5–2	T–2nd	
2001	Morehouse	8–2	6–1	T–1st	
Morehouse:		18–13	12–8		
Alabama A&M Bulldogs (Southwestern Athletic Conference) (2002–2013)
2002	Alabama A&M	8–4	6–1	1st (East)	
2003	Alabama A&M	8–4	4–3	3rd (East)	
2004	Alabama A&M	7–4	5–2	2nd (East)	
2005	Alabama A&M	9–3	7–2	1st (East)	
2006	Alabama A&M	9–3	6–3	1st (East)	
2007	Alabama A&M	8–3	6–3	2nd (East)	
2008	Alabama A&M	5–7	4–3	2nd (East)	
2009	Alabama A&M	7–5	4–3	1st (East)	
2010	Alabama A&M	3–8	2–7	4th (East)	
2011	Alabama A&M	8–4	7–2	1st (East)	
2012	Alabama A&M	7–4	6–3	3rd (East)	
2013	Alabama A&M	4–8	4–5	4th (East)	
Alabama A&M:		83–57	61–37		
Elizabeth City State Vikings (Central Intercollegiate Athletic Association) (2018–2021)
2018	Elizabeth City State	1–7	0–6	6th (Northern)	
2019	Elizabeth City State	2–9	2–5	T–4th (Northern)	
2020–21	No team—COVID-19				
2021	Elizabeth City State	3–7	3–4	T–4th (Northern)	
Elizabeth City State:		6–23	5–15		
Total:		107–93			
National championship Conference title Conference division title or championship game berth
