= Charles Coe (American football) =

American football player and coach (born 1948)

Biographical details
- Born: October 31, 1948 (age 77); St. Louis, Missouri, U.S.

Playing career

Football
- 1968–1971: Kansas State

Baseball
- 1969–1971: Kansas State
- 1971: Batavia Trojans
- Positions: Second base, shortstop (baseball)

Coaching career (HC unless noted)

Football
- 1976: Iowa (assistant)
- 1977–1979: Cincinnati (assistant)
- 1982: Ball State (assistant)
- 1983–1984: Louisville (assistant)
- 1985–1988: Missouri (assistant)
- 1989: Kansas State (assistant)
- 1990–1992: Tennessee (RB/WR)
- 1993: Pittsburgh (RB)
- 1997–1999: Memphis (RB)
- 2000–2002: Memphis (AHC/WR)
- 2003–2006: Alabama State
- 2007: Oakland Raiders (WR)
- 2011: Texas Southern (OC)
- 2014–2021: Missouri Baptist (OC/QB)
- 2022–2025: Missouri Baptist (AHC/DL)
- 2025-2026: Missouri Baptist (Interim Head Coach)

Head coaching record
- Overall: 29–18

Accomplishments and honors

Championships
- 1 SWAC (2004); 2 SWAC East Division (2003–2004)

Charles Coe (born October 31, 1948) is an American football coach and former football and baseball player.

From 2003 to 2006, Coe served as the head football coach at Alabama State University, compiling a record of 29–18. A standout two-sport athlete at Kansas State University during his playing days, Coe spent two years in the Detroit Tigers minor league system.

Coe is the father of former National Football League (NFL) cornerback Michael Coe.

== Head coaching record ==
Year	Team	Overall	Conference	Standing	Bowl/playoffs	TSN^{#}
Alabama State Hornets (Southwestern Athletic Conference) (2003–2006)
2003	Alabama State	8–5	5–2	T–1st (East)		
2004	Alabama State	10–2	6–1	1st (East)		20
2005	Alabama State	6–5	6–3	2nd (East)		
2006	Alabama State	5–6	5–4	T–2nd (East)		
Alabama State:		29–18	22–10			
Total:		29–18				
National championship Conference title Conference division title or championship game berth
