= 2004 Elon Phoenix football team =

American college football season

2004 Elon Phoenix football
- Conference: Southern Conference
- Record: 3–8 (2–5 SoCon)
- Head coach: Paul Hamilton (1st season)
- Home stadium: Rhodes Stadium

2004 Southern Conference football standings
	Conf.			Overall
Team	W		L	W		L
No. 5 Furman $^	6	–	1	10	–	3
No. 10 Georgia Southern $^	6	–	1	9	–	3
No. 18 Wofford	4	–	3	8	–	3
Appalachian State	4	–	3	6	–	5
Western Carolina	2	–	5	4	–	7
The Citadel	2	–	5	3	–	7
Elon	2	–	5	3	–	8
Chattanooga	2	–	5	2	–	9
$ – Conference champion; ^ – NCAA Division I-AA playoff participant; Rankings from The Sports Network I-AA Poll

The 2004 Elon Phoenix football team was an American football team that represented Elon University as a member of the Southern Conference (SoCon) during the 2004 NCAA Division I-AA football season. Led by first-year head coach Paul Hamilton, the Phoenix compiled an overall record of 3–8, with a mark of 2–5 in conference play, and finished tied for fifth in the SoCon.

== Schedule ==
Date	Time	Opponent	Site	Result	Attendance	Source
September 4	2:00 p.m.	Towson*	Rhodes Stadium; Elon, NC	L 13–34	5,436	
September 18	2:00 p.m.	Delaware State*	Rhodes Stadium; Elon, NC	W 49–13	6,935	
September 25	1:30 p.m.	at North Carolina A&T*	Aggie Stadium; Greensboro, NC	L 17–19	8,250	
October 2	1:00 p.m.	at No. 3 Georgia Southern	Paulson Stadium; Statesboro, GA	L 14–48	12,821	
October 9	6:00 p.m.	No. 8 Wofford	Rhodes Stadium; Elon, NC	L 13–27	5,226	
October 16	4:00 p.m.	at Chattanooga	Finley Stadium; Chattanooga, TN	W 35–26	6,246	
October 23	7:00 p.m.	No. 7 Furman	Rhodes Stadium; Elon, NC	L 0–10	4,872	
October 30	2:00 p.m.	Western Carolina	Rhodes Stadium; Elon, NC	L 7–28	7,328	
November 6	2:00 p.m.	at Appalachian State	Kidd Brewer Stadium; Boone, NC	L 7–48	11,347	
November 13	2:00 p.m.	The Citadel	Rhodes Stadium; Elon, NC	W 24–7	2,011	
November 20	1:30 p.m.	at Liberty*	Williams Stadium; Lynchburg, VA	L 17–27	2,293	
*Non-conference game; Rankings from The Sports Network Poll released prior to the game; All times are in Eastern time
