= 2004 Jacksonville State Gamecocks football team =

American college football season

2004 Jacksonville State Gamecocks football

OVC champion

NCAA Division I-AA First Round, L 7–49 at Furman
- Conference: Ohio Valley Conference

Ranking
- Sports Network: No. 14
- Record: 9–2 (7–1 OVC)
- Head coach: Jack Crowe (5th season)
- Offensive coordinator: Ronnie Letson (1st season)
- Defensive coordinator: Greg Stewart (5th season)
- Home stadium: Paul Snow Stadium

2004 Ohio Valley Conference football standings
	Conf.			Overall
Team	W		L	W		L
No. 14 Jacksonville State $^	7	–	1	9	–	2
Murray State	6	–	2	7	–	4
Eastern Kentucky	6	–	2	6	–	5
Eastern Illinois	4	–	4	5	–	6
Tennessee Tech	3	–	4	6	–	5
Samford	3	–	5	4	–	7
Southeast Missouri State	3	–	5	3	–	8
Tennessee State	2	–	5	4	–	7
Tennessee–Martin	1	–	7	2	–	9
$ – Conference champion; ^ – NCAA Division I-AA playoff participant; Rankings from The Sports Network poll

The 2004 Jacksonville State Gamecocks football team represented Jacksonville State University as a member of the Ohio Valley Conference (OVC) during the 2004 NCAA Division I-AA football season. Led by Fifth-year head coach Jack Crowe, the Gamecocks compiled an overall record of 9–2 with a mark of 7–1 in conference play, winning the OVC title for the second year in a row. Jacksonville State made the NCAA Division I-AA Football Championship playoffs for the second straight year as well. Jacksonville State played home games at Paul Snow Stadium in Jacksonville, Alabama.

== Schedule ==
Date	Time	Opponent	Rank	Site	Result	Attendance	Source
August 30	2:00 p.m.	Emporia State*		Paul Snow Stadium; Jacksonville, AL	W 25–16	8,212	
September 18	5:00 p.m.	at Chattanooga*		Finley Stadium; Chattanooga, TN	W 65–20	6,642	
September 25	5:30 p.m.	at Eastern Kentucky		Roy Kidd Stadium; Richmond, KY	W 30–23	9,400	
October 2	2:00 p.m.	Murray State	No. 22	Paul Snow Stadium; Jacksonville, AL	W 35–14	8,408	
October 9	2:00 p.m.	at Tennessee–Martin	No. 15	Graham Stadium; Martin, TN	W 59–12	4,426	
October 16	4:00 p.m.	Tennessee State	No. 14	Paul Snow Stadium; Jacksonville, AL	W 49–35	14,722	
October 23	7:00 p.m.	at Tennessee Tech	No. 12	Tucker Stadium; Cookeville, TN	L 13–16	2,106	
November 6	4:00 p.m.	Samford	No. 15	Paul Snow Stadium; Jacksonville, AL (rivalry)	W 51–18	13,013	
November 13	1:30 p.m.	at Eastern Illinois	No. 14	O'Brien Stadium; Charleston, IL	W 31–21	2,019	
November 20	2:00 p.m.	Southeast Missouri State	No. 14	Paul Snow Stadium; Jacksonville, AL	W 47–9	6,155	
November 27	11:00 a.m.	at No. 2 Furman	No. 14	Paladin Stadium; Greenville, SC (NCAA Division I-AA First Round)	L 7–49	7,051	
*Non-conference game; Rankings from The Sports Network Poll released prior to the game; All times are in Central time
