= 2004 South Carolina State Bulldogs football team =

American college football season

2004 South Carolina State Bulldogs football

MEAC co-champion
- Conference: Mid-Eastern Athletic Conference

Ranking
- Sports Network: No. 22
- Record: 9–2 (6–1 MEAC)
- Head coach: Oliver Pough (3rd season)
- Home stadium: Oliver C. Dawson Stadium

2004 Mid-Eastern Athletic Conference football standings
	Conf.			Overall
Team	W		L	W		L
No. 12 Hampton +^	6	–	1	10	–	2
No. 22 South Carolina State +	6	–	1	9	–	2
Bethune–Cookman	4	–	3	6	–	4
Delaware State	4	–	3	4	–	7
Howard	3	–	4	6	–	5
Morgan State	3	–	4	5	–	6
North Carolina A&T	1	–	6	3	–	8
Norfolk State	1	–	6	1	–	8
+ – Conference co-champions; ^ – NCAA Division I-AA playoff participant; Rankings from The Sports Network poll

The 2004 South Carolina State Bulldogs football team represented South Carolina State University as a member of the Mid-Eastern Athletic Conference (MEAC) during the 2004 NCAA Division I-AA football season. Led by third-year head coach Oliver Pough, the Bulldogs compiled an overall record of 9–2, with a mark of 6–1 in conference play, and finished as MEAC co-champion.

== Schedule ==
Date	Opponent	Rank	Site	Result	Attendance	Source
September 4	vs. Benedict*		Williams–Brice Stadium; Columbia, SC (Palmetto Classic)	W 51–0	49,000	
September 11	No. 3 Wofford*		Oliver C. Dawson Stadium; Orangeburg, SC	L 22–24	6,619	
September 18	at Savannah State*		Ted Wright Stadium; Savannah, GA	W 55–20	4,601	
October 2	vs. Tennessee State*		RCA Dome; Indianapolis, IN (Circle City Classic)	W 30–13	52,440	
October 9	at Norfolk State		William "Dick" Price Stadium; Norfolk, VA	W 39–14		
October 16	Bethune–Cookman		Oliver C. Dawson Stadium; Orangeburg, SC	W 28–14		
October 23	No. 17 Hampton	No. 20	Oliver C. Dawson Stadium; Orangeburg, SC	L 36–52	17,127	
October 30	at Delaware State		Alumni Stadium; Dover, DE	W 28–14	6,583	
November 6	Howard		Oliver C. Dawson Stadium; Orangeburg, SC	W 23–16		
November 13	Morgan State		Oliver C. Dawson Stadium; Orangeburg, SC	W 38–35 ^{OT}	5,079	
November 20	vs. North Carolina A&T	No. 23	American Legion Memorial Stadium; Charlotte, NC (rivalry)	W 34–28	16,824	
*Non-conference game; Rankings from The Sports Network Poll released prior to the game
