= 2004 Coastal Carolina Chanticleers football team =

American college football season

2004 Coastal Carolina Chanticleers football

Big South champion
- Conference: Big South Conference

Ranking
- Sports Network: No. 24
- Record: 10–1 (4–0 Big South)
- Head coach: David Bennett (2nd season)
- Offensive coordinator: Jamie Snider (2nd season)
- Offensive scheme: Multiple
- Defensive coordinator: Curtis Walker (2nd season)
- Base defense: 4–3
- Home stadium: Brooks Stadium

2004 Big South Conference football standings
	Conf.			Overall
Team	W		L	W		L
No. 24 Coastal Carolina $	4	–	0	10	–	1
Liberty	3	–	1	6	–	5
Gardner–Webb	2	–	2	5	–	6
Charleston Southern	1	–	3	5	–	5
VMI	0	–	4	0	–	11
$ – Conference champion; Rankings from The Sports Network poll

The 2004 Coastal Carolina Chanticleers football team represented Coastal Carolina University as a member of the Big South Conference during the 2004 NCAA Division I-AA football season. Led by second-year head coach David Bennett, the Chanticleers compiled an overall record of 10–1 with a mark of 4–0 in conference play, winning the Big South title. Coastal Carolina played home games at Brooks Stadium in Conway, South Carolina.

== Schedule ==
Date	Time	Opponent	Rank	Site	Result	Attendance
September 4	7:00 p.m.	at Morehead State*		Jayne Stadium; Morehead, KY	W 28–7	6,314
September 11	7:00 p.m.	Davidson*		Brooks Stadium; Conway, SC	W 31–24	6,943
September 18	7:00 p.m.	at Newberry*		Setzler Field; Newberry, SC	L 7–21	4,278
September 25	7:00 p.m.	North Greenville*		Brooks Stadium; Conway, SC	W 58–7	6,018
October 9	7:00 p.m.	Charleston (WV)*		Brooks Stadium; Conway, SC	W 48–13	5,245
October 16	1:00 p.m.	at VMI		Alumni Memorial Field; Lexington, VA	W 21–14	6,419
October 23	7:00 p.m.	Liberty		Brooks Stadium; Conway, SC (rivalry)	W 33–6	7,439
October 30	1:30 p.m.	at Gardner–Webb		Ernest W. Spangler Stadium; Boiling Springs, NC	W 31–19	6,486
November 6	12:30 p.m.	Savannah State*		Brooks Stadium; Conway, SC	W 52–14	6,611
November 13	12:30 p.m.	Jacksonville*	No. 24	Brooks Stadium; Conway, SC	W 48–23	4,752
November 20	7:00 p.m.	Charleston Southern	No. 21	Brooks Stadium; Conway, SC	W 56–28	6,492
*Non-conference game; Rankings from The Sports Network Poll released prior to the game; All times are in Eastern time
