= 2004 Bethune–Cookman Wildcats football team =

American college football season

2004 Bethune–Cookman Wildcats football
- Conference: Mid-Eastern Athletic Conference
- Record: 6–4 (4–3 MEAC)
- Head coach: Alvin Wyatt (8th season)
- Home stadium: Municipal Stadium

2004 Mid-Eastern Athletic Conference football standings
	Conf.			Overall
Team	W		L	W		L
No. 12 Hampton +^	6	–	1	10	–	2
No. 22 South Carolina State +	6	–	1	9	–	2
Bethune–Cookman	4	–	3	6	–	4
Delaware State	4	–	3	4	–	7
Howard	3	–	4	6	–	5
Morgan State	3	–	4	5	–	6
North Carolina A&T	1	–	6	3	–	8
Norfolk State	1	–	6	1	–	8
+ – Conference co-champions; ^ – NCAA Division I-AA playoff participant; Rankings from The Sports Network poll

The 2004 Bethune–Cookman Wildcats football team represented Bethune–Cookman College (now known as Bethune–Cookman University) as a member of the Mid-Eastern Athletic Conference (MEAC) during the 2004 NCAA Division I-AA football season. Led by eighth-year head coach Alvin Wyatt, the Wildcats compiled an overall record of 6–4, with a mark of 4–3 in conference play, and finished tied for third in the MEAC.

== Schedule ==
Date	Opponent	Site	Result	Attendance	Source
September 4	vs. Savannah State*	Alltel Stadium; Jacksonville, FL (Gateway Classic)	Canceled		
September 11	at Arkansas–Pine Bluff*	Golden Lion Stadium; Pine Bluff, AR	W 27–14		
September 18	vs. Grambling State*	Paul Brown Stadium; Cincinnati, OH (P&G Ohio Classic)	L 23–24	35,608	
September 28	Norfolk State	Municipal Stadium; Daytona Beach, FL	W 43–3	4,225	
October 2	at Morgan State	Hughes Stadium; Baltimore, MD	W 51–21		
October 9	Delaware State	Municipal Stadium; Daytona Beach, FL	W 45–16	13,481	
October 16	at South Carolina State	Oliver C. Dawson Stadium; Orangeburg, SC	L 14–28		
October 30	at North Carolina A&T	Aggie Stadium; Greensboro, NC	W 45–17	14,528	
November 6	at No. 14 Hampton	Armstrong Stadium; Hampton, VA	L 17–24	19,322	
November 13	Howard	Municipal Stadium; Daytona Beach, FL	L 7–10	4,165	
November 20	vs. Florida A&M*	Florida Citrus Bowl; Orlando, FL (Florida Classic)	W 58–52 ^{OT}	71,153	
*Non-conference game; Rankings from The Sports Network Poll released prior to the game
