= 2004 Texas Southern Tigers football team =

American college football season

2004 Texas Southern Tigers football
- Conference: Southwestern Athletic Conference
- West Division
- Record: 0–11 (0–7 SWAC)
- Head coach: Steve Wilson (1st season)
- Home stadium: Reliant Stadium; Reliant Astrodome; Robertson Stadium

2004 Southwestern Athletic Conference football standings
	Conf.			Overall
Team	W		L	W		L
East
No. 20 Alabama State xy$	6	–	1	10	–	2
Alabama A&M	5	–	2	7	–	4
Alcorn State	4	–	3	7	–	4
Jackson State	3	–	4	4	–	7
Mississippi Valley State	1	–	6	3	–	8
West
Southern xy	6	–	1	8	–	4
Arkansas–Pine Bluff	5	–	2	6	–	3
Grambling State	3	–	4	6	–	5
Prairie View A&M	1	–	6	3	–	8
Texas Southern	0	–	7	0	–	11
Championship: Alabama State 40, Southern 35
$ – Conference champion; x – Division champion/co-champions; y – Championship game participant; Rankings from The Sports Network Poll

The 2004 Texas Southern Tigers football team represented Texas Southern University as a member of the Southwestern Athletic Conference (SWAC) during the 2004 NCAA Division I-AA football season. Led by first-year head coach Steve Wilson, the Tigers compiled an overall record of 0–11, with a mark of 0–7 in conference play, and finished fifth in the West Division of the SWAC.

== Schedule ==
Date	Opponent	Site	Result	Attendance	Source
August 30	Prairie View A&M	Reliant Stadium; Houston, TX (Labor Day Classic)	L 7–25		
September 11	at Alabama State	Cramton Bowl; Montgomery, AL	L 15–55		
September 18	at No. 21 Northwestern State*	Harry Turpin Stadium; Natchitoches, LA	L 6–52	13,110	
September 25	Nicholls State*	Robertson Stadium; Houston, TX	L 6–21		
October 2	Alabama A&M	Robertson Stadium; Houston, TX	L 3–22		
October 9	vs. Arkansas–Pine Bluff	Soldier Field; Chicago, IL (Chicago Football Classic)	L 0–42		
October 16	at Alcorn State	Jack Spinks Stadium; Lorman, MS	L 0–30		
October 23	Mississippi Valley State	Robertson Stadium; Houston, TX	L 14–15		
October 30	Grambling State	Reliant Astrodome; Houston, TX	L 10–28		
November 13	at Southern	A. W. Mumford Stadium; Baton Rouge, LA	L 0–28		
November 20	Morgan State*	Reliant Astrodome; Houston, TX	L 21–37		
*Non-conference game; Rankings from The Sports Network Poll released prior to the game
