= 2004 Tennessee State Tigers football team =

American college football season

2004 Tennessee State Tigers football
- Conference: Ohio Valley Conference
- Record: 4–7 (2–5 OVC)
- Head coach: James Reese (5th season)
- Defensive coordinator: Rod Reed (2nd season)
- Home stadium: The Coliseum

2004 Ohio Valley Conference football standings
| | Conf. | | | Overall |
| Team | W | | L | W | | L |
|---|---|---|---|---|---|---|
| No. 14 Jacksonville State $^ | 7 | – | 1 | 9 | – | 2 |
| Murray State | 6 | – | 2 | 7 | – | 4 |
| Eastern Kentucky | 6 | – | 2 | 6 | – | 5 |
| Eastern Illinois | 4 | – | 4 | 5 | – | 6 |
| Tennessee Tech | 3 | – | 4 | 6 | – | 5 |
| Samford | 3 | – | 5 | 4 | – | 7 |
| Southeast Missouri State | 3 | – | 5 | 3 | – | 8 |
| Tennessee State | 2 | – | 5 | 4 | – | 7 |
| Tennessee–Martin | 1 | – | 7 | 2 | – | 9 |
$ – Conference champion; ^ – NCAA Division I-AA playoff participant; Rankings from The Sports Network poll

The 2004 Tennessee State Tigers football team represented Tennessee State University as a member of the Ohio Valley Conference (OVC) during the 2004 NCAA Division I-AA football season. Led by fifth-year head coach James Reese, the Tigers compiled an overall record of 4–7, with a conference record of 2–5, and finished eighth in the OVC.

== Schedule ==
| Date | Opponent | Site | Result | Attendance | Source |
|---|---|---|---|---|---|
| September 4 | Alabama A&M* | The Coliseum; Nashville, TN | W 42–7 | 25,117 | |
| September 9 | at Tennessee–Martin | Graham Stadium; Martin, TN | W 27–13 | | |
| September 18 | vs. Jackson State* | Liberty Bowl Memorial Stadium; Memphis, TN (Southern Heritage Classic) | W 21–20 | 55,015 | |
| September 25 | vs. Florida A&M* | Georgia Dome; Atlanta, GA (Atlanta Football Classic) | L 15–21 | 67,712 | |
| October 2 | vs. South Carolina State* | RCA Dome; Indianapolis, IN (Circle City Classic) | L 13–30 | 52,440 | |
| October 16 | at No. 14 Jacksonville State | Paul Snow Stadium; Jacksonville, AL | L 35–49 | 14,722 | |
| October 23 | Samford | The Coliseum; Nashville, TN | L 36–42 ^{OT} | 5,023 | |
| October 30 | at Eastern Illinois | O'Brien Stadium; Charleston, IL | L 24–34 | 5,422 | |
| November 6 | Southeast Missouri State | The Coliseum; Nashville, TN | W 38–36 | | |
| November 13 | at Eastern Kentucky | Roy Kidd Stadium; Richmond, KY | L 14–29 | 7,100 | |
| November 20 | Murray State | The Coliseum; Nashville, TN | L 13–30 | 4,864 | |
*Non-conference game; Rankings from The Sports Network Poll released prior to the game
