= 2004 Jackson State Tigers football team =

American college football season

2004 Jackson State Tigers football
- Conference: Southwestern Athletic Conference
- East Division
- Record: 4–7 (3–4 SWAC)
- Head coach: James Bell (2nd season)
- Home stadium: Mississippi Veterans Memorial Stadium

2004 Southwestern Athletic Conference football standings
	Conf.			Overall
Team	W		L	W		L
East
No. 20 Alabama State xy$	6	–	1	10	–	2
Alabama A&M	5	–	2	7	–	4
Alcorn State	4	–	3	7	–	4
Jackson State	3	–	4	4	–	7
Mississippi Valley State	1	–	6	3	–	8
West
Southern xy	6	–	1	8	–	4
Arkansas–Pine Bluff	5	–	2	6	–	3
Grambling State	3	–	4	6	–	5
Prairie View A&M	1	–	6	3	–	8
Texas Southern	0	–	7	0	–	11
Championship: Alabama State 40, Southern 35
$ – Conference champion; x – Division champion/co-champions; y – Championship game participant; Rankings from The Sports Network Poll

The 2004 Jackson State Tigers football team represented Jackson State University as a member of the Southwestern Athletic Conference (SWAC) during the 2004 NCAA Division I-AA football season. Led by second-year head coach James Bell, the Tigers compiled an overall record of 4–7 and a mark of 3–4 in conference play, and finished fourth in the SWAC East Division.

== Schedule ==
Date	Opponent	Site	Result	Attendance	Source
September 4	at Hampton*	Armstrong Stadium; Hampton, VA	L 19–38	7,553	
September 11	Northwestern State*	Mississippi Veterans Memorial Stadium; Jackson, MS	L 20–28	10,500	
September 18	vs. Tennessee State*	Liberty Bowl Memorial Stadium; Memphis, TN (Southern Heritage Classic)	L 20–21	55,015	
September 25	Mississippi Valley State	Mississippi Veterans Memorial Stadium; Jackson, MS	W 31–16		
October 9	vs. Alabama State	Ladd–Peebles Stadium; Mobile, AL (Gulf Coast Classic)	L 6–28	11,027	
October 16	vs. Southern	Louisiana Superdome; New Orleans, LA (rivalry)	L 7–45		
October 23	at Grambling State	Eddie G. Robinson Memorial Stadium; Grambling, LA	W 33–23	15,085	
October 30	at Arkansas–Pine Bluff	Golden Lion Stadium; Pine Bluff, AR	W 42–35	17,100	
November 6	Alabama A&M	Mississippi Veterans Memorial Stadium; Jackson, MS	L 6–22		
November 13	at Prairie View A&M	Edward L. Blackshear Field; Prairie View, TX	W 45–28		
November 20	Alcorn State	Mississippi Veterans Memorial Stadium; Jackson, MS (Capital City Classic)	L 14–16		
*Non-conference game
