= 2004 Alabama State Hornets football team =

American college football season

2004 Alabama State Hornets football

SWAC East Division champion SWAC champion

SWAC Championship Game, W 40–35 vs. Southern
- Conference: Southwestern Athletic Conference
- East Division

Ranking
- Sports Network: No. 20
- Record: 10–2 (6–1 SWAC)
- Head coach: Charles Coe (2nd season)
- Offensive coordinator: Chris Kapilovic (2nd season)
- Home stadium: Cramton Bowl

2004 Southwestern Athletic Conference football standings
	Conf.			Overall
Team	W		L	W		L
East
No. 20 Alabama State xy$	6	–	1	10	–	2
Alabama A&M	5	–	2	7	–	4
Alcorn State	4	–	3	7	–	4
Jackson State	3	–	4	4	–	7
Mississippi Valley State	1	–	6	3	–	8
West
Southern xy	6	–	1	8	–	4
Arkansas–Pine Bluff	5	–	2	6	–	3
Grambling State	3	–	4	6	–	5
Prairie View A&M	1	–	6	3	–	8
Texas Southern	0	–	7	0	–	11
Championship: Alabama State 40, Southern 35
$ – Conference champion; x – Division champion/co-champions; y – Championship game participant; Rankings from The Sports Network Poll

The 2004 Alabama State Hornets football team represented Alabama State University as a member of the Southwestern Athletic Conference (SWAC) during the 2004 NCAA Division I-AA football season. Led by second-year head coach Charles Coe, the Hornets compiled an overall record of 10–2, with a mark of 6–1 in conference play, finished as SWAC East Division champion, and defeated Southern in the SWAC Championship Game.

== Schedule ==
Date	Opponent	Rank	Site	Result	Attendance	Source
September 4	vs. Howard*		Ford Field; Detroit, MI (Detroit Classic)	W 27–12	45,713	
September 11	Texas Southern		Cramton Bowl; Montgomery, AL	W 55–15		
September 25	at Alcorn State		Jack Spinks Stadium; Lorman, MS	W 41–8		
October 2	Southern		Cramton Bowl; Montgomery, AL	L 41–42		
October 9	vs. Jackson State		Ladd–Peebles Stadium; Mobile, AL (Gulf Coast Classic)	W 28–6	11,027	
October 16	at Prairie View A&M		Edward L. Blackshear Field; Prairie View, TX	W 42–20	2,102	
October 30	vs. Alabama A&M		Legion Field; Birmingham, AL (Magic City Classic)	W 24–20		
November 6	at Grambling State	No. 25	Eddie G. Robinson Memorial Stadium; Grambling, LA	W 37–23		
November 13	Mississippi Valley State	No. 20	Cramton Bowl; Montgomery, AL	W 34–6		
November 25	Tuskegee*	No. 19	Cramton Bowl; Montgomery, AL (Turkey Day Classic)	L 17–27		
December 4	Arkansas–Pine Bluff	No. 20	Cramton Bowl; Montgomery, AL	W 21–14		
December 11	vs. Southern	No. 20	Legion Field; Birmingham, AL (SWAC Championship Game)	W 40–35	22,327	
*Non-conference game; Rankings from The Sports Network Poll released prior to the game
