= 2004 Liberty Flames football team =

American college football season

2004 Liberty Flames football
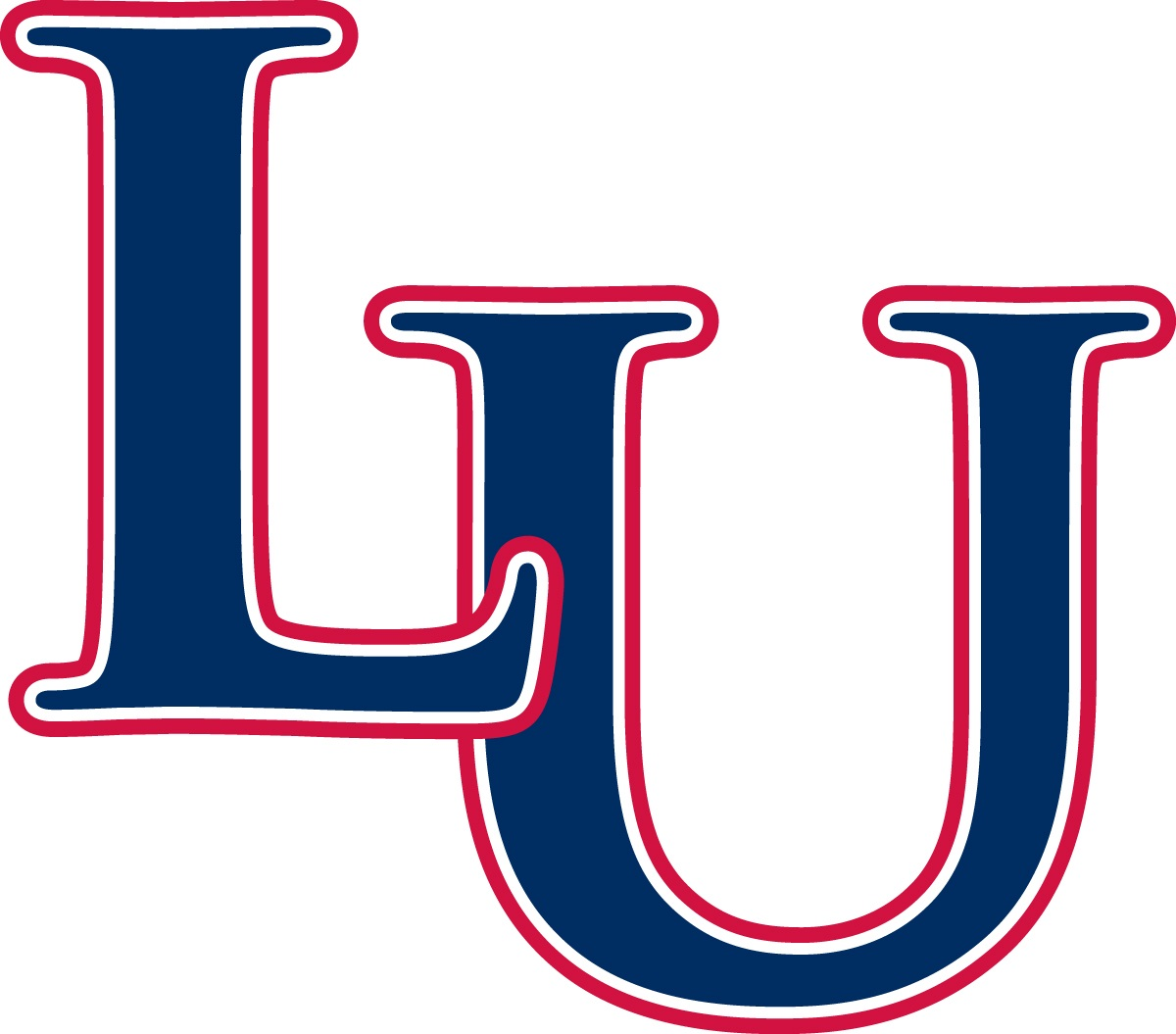
- Conference: Big South Conference
- Record: 6–5 (3–1 Big South)
- Head coach: Ken Karcher (5th season)
- Home stadium: Williams Stadium

2004 Big South Conference football standings
	Conf.			Overall
Team	W		L	W		L
No. 24 Coastal Carolina $	4	–	0	10	–	1
Liberty	3	–	1	6	–	5
Gardner–Webb	2	–	2	5	–	6
Charleston Southern	1	–	3	5	–	5
VMI	0	–	4	0	–	11
$ – Conference champion; Rankings from The Sports Network poll

The 2004 Liberty Flames football team represented Liberty University a member of the Big South Conference during the 2004 NCAA Division I-AA football season. Led by fifth-year head coach Ken Karcher, the Flames compiled an overall record of 6–5 with a mark of 3–1 in conference play, placing in second in the Big South. Liberty played home games at Williams Stadium in Lynchburg, Virginia.

== Schedule ==
Date	Time	Opponent	Site	Result	Attendance	Source
September 4	7:00 pm	West Virginia Tech*	Williams Stadium; Lynchburg, VA	W 55–14	10,557	
September 11	7:00 pm	at Kent State*	Dix Stadium; Kent, OH	L 10–38	17,459	
September 18	7:00 pm	No. 24 Lehigh*	Williams Stadium; Lynchburg, VA	L 16–34	10,895	
September 25	6:00 pm	at Youngstown State*	Stambaugh Stadium; Youngstown, OH	L 17–27	14,958	
October 2	7:00 pm	Gardner–Webb^{†}	Williams Stadium; Lynchburg, VA	W 17–9	11,719	
October 9	7:00 pm	No. 18 William & Mary*	Williams Stadium; Lynchburg, VA	L 17–37	9,603	
October 23	7:00 pm	at Coastal Carolina	Brooks Stadium; Conway, SC (rivalry)	L 6–33	7,439	
October 30	1:30 pm	Charleston Southern	Williams Stadium; Lynchburg, VA	W 34–6	5,717	
November 6	1:05 pm	at VMI	Alumni Memorial Field; Lexington, VA	W 38–17	4,640	
November 13	1:30 p.m.	at Chattanooga*	Finley Stadium; Chattanooga, TN	W 43–40	4,706	
November 20	1:30 p.m.	Elon*	Williams Stadium; Lynchburg, VA	W 27–17	2,293	
*Non-conference game; ^{†}Homecoming; Rankings from The Sports Network Poll released prior to the game; All times are in Eastern time
