= 2004 The Citadel Bulldogs football team =

American college football season

2004 The Citadel Bulldogs football
- Conference: Southern Conference
- Record: 3–7 (2–5 SoCon)
- Head coach: John Zernhelt (1st season)
- Defensive coordinator: Dick Hopkins (1st season)
- Base defense: 4–3
- Home stadium: Johnson Hagood Stadium

2004 Southern Conference football standings
	Conf.			Overall
Team	W		L	W		L
No. 5 Furman $^	6	–	1	10	–	3
No. 10 Georgia Southern $^	6	–	1	9	–	3
No. 18 Wofford	4	–	3	8	–	3
Appalachian State	4	–	3	6	–	5
Western Carolina	2	–	5	4	–	7
The Citadel	2	–	5	3	–	7
Elon	2	–	5	3	–	8
Chattanooga	2	–	5	2	–	9
$ – Conference champion; ^ – NCAA Division I-AA playoff participant; Rankings from The Sports Network I-AA Poll

The 2004 The Citadel Bulldogs football team represented The Citadel, The Military College of South Carolina in the 2004 NCAA Division I-AA football season. John Zernhelt served as head coach for the first season. The Bulldogs played as members of the Southern Conference and played home games at Johnson Hagood Stadium.

== Schedule ==
Date	Time	Opponent	Site	Result	Attendance	Source
September 4		Charleston Southern*	Johnson Hagood Stadium; Charleston, SC	Canceled (Note: The Bulldogs first game of the season against Charleston Southern was cancelled due to Hurricane Gaston.)	N/A	
September 18	2:00 pm	at No. 20 Appalachian State	Kidd Brewer Stadium; Boone, NC	L 14–28	8,931	
September 25	2:30 pm	at No. 9 (I-A) Auburn*	Jordan–Hare Stadium; Auburn, AL	L 3–33	76,302	
October 2	2:00 pm	at Duke*	Wallace Wade Stadium; Durham, NC	L 10–28	16,814	
October 7	7:00 pm	Benedict*	Johnson Hagood Stadium; Charleston, SC	W 29–0	5,127	
October 16	2:00 pm	at No. 8 Furman	Paladin Stadium; Greenville, SC (rivalry)	L 14–33	14,481	
October 23	2:00 pm	No. 2 Georgia Southern	Johnson Hagood Stadium; Charleston, SC	L 7–42	12,472	
October 30	1:30 pm	at No. 11 Wofford	Gibbs Stadium; Spartanburg, SC (rivalry)	L 17–38	9,019	
November 6	2:00 pm	Chattanooga^{†}	Johnson Hagood Stadium; Charleston, SC	W 44–24	11,962	
November 13	2:00 pm	Elon	Rhodes Stadium; Elon, NC	L 7–24	2,011	
November 20	12:00 pm	Western Carolina	Johnson Hagood Stadium; Charleston, SC	W 17–0	3,874	
*Non-conference game; ^{†}Homecoming; Rankings from The Sports Network Poll released prior to the game; All times are in Eastern time
