= 2006 Prairie View A&M Panthers football team =

American college football season

2006 Prairie View A&M Panthers football
- Conference: Southwestern Athletic Conference
- West Division
- Record: 3–7 (2–7 SWAC)
- Head coach: Henry Frazier III (3rd season)
- Home stadium: Edward L. Blackshear Field; Tully Stadium

2006 Southwestern Athletic Conference football standings
	Conf.			Overall
Team	W		L	W		L
East Division
Alabama A&M xy$	6	–	3	9	–	3
Jackson State	5	–	4	6	–	5
Alcorn State	5	–	4	6	–	5
Mississippi Valley State	5	–	4	6	–	5
Alabama State	5	–	4	5	–	6
West Division
Arkansas–Pine Bluff xy	7	–	2	8	–	4
Southern	4	–	5	5	–	6
Grambling State	3	–	6	3	–	8
Texas Southern	3	–	6	3	–	8
Prairie View A&M	2	–	7	3	–	7
Championship: Alabama A&M 22, Arkansas–Pine Bluff 13
$ – Conference champion; x – Division champion/co-champions; y – Championship game participant

The 2006 Prairie View A&M Panthers football team represented Prairie View A&M University as a member of the Southwestern Athletic Conference (SWAC) during the 2006 NCAA Division I FCS football season. Led by third-year head coach Henry Frazier III, the Panthers compiled an overall record of 3–7, with a mark of 2–7 in conference play, and finished fifth in the SWAC West Division.

== Schedule ==
Date	Opponent	Site	Result	Attendance	Source
September 2	at Texas Southern	Reliant Stadium; Houston, TX (Labor Day Classic)	L 14–17	16,116	
September 9	Edward Waters*	Edward L. Blackshear Field; Prairie View, TX	W 37–0		
September 16	Southern	Tully Stadium; Houston, TX	W 26–23 ^{OT}		
September 24	Langston*	Edward L. Blackshear Field; Prairie View, TX	Canceled (Note: Langston was up 28–7 with 4:01 left in the third quarter when play was suspended due to lightning. The game was not continued and subsequently canceled.)		
September 30	vs. Grambling State	Cotton Bowl; Dallas, TX (rivalry)	L 7–53	48,220	
October 5	Alcorn State	Edward L. Blackshear Field; Prairie View, TX	L 14–17		
October 14	Alabama State	Edward L. Blackshear Field; Prairie View, TX	L 7–10	3,281	
October 28	at Mississippi Valley State	Rice–Totten Stadium; Itta Bena, MS	L 10–14		
November 4	Arkansas–Pine Bluff	Edward L. Blackshear Field; Prairie View, TX	L 21–28		
November 11	at Jackson State	Mississippi Veterans Memorial Stadium; Jackson, MS	L 7–31		
November 18	at Alabama A&M	Louis Crews Stadium; Normal, AL	W 13–7		
*Non-conference game
