= 2004 Georgia Southern Eagles football team =

American college football season

2004 Georgia Southern Eagles football

SoCon co-champion

NCAA Division I-AA First Round, L 23–27 vs. New Hampshire
- Conference: Southern Conference

Ranking
- Sports Network: No. 10
- Record: 9–3 (6–1 SoCon)
- Head coach: Mike Sewak (3rd season)
- Offensive coordinator: Mitch Ware (3rd season)
- Defensive coordinator: Joe Tresey (1st season)
- Home stadium: Paulson Stadium (Capacity: 18,000)

2004 Southern Conference football standings
	Conf.			Overall
Team	W		L	W		L
No. 5 Furman +^	6	–	1	10	–	3
No. 10 Georgia Southern +^	6	–	1	9	–	3
No. 18 Wofford	4	–	3	8	–	3
Appalachian State	4	–	3	6	–	5
Western Carolina	2	–	5	4	–	7
The Citadel	2	–	5	3	–	7
Elon	2	–	5	3	–	8
Chattanooga	2	–	5	2	–	9
+ – Conference co-champions; ^ – NCAA Division I-AA playoff participant; Rankings from The Sports Network poll

The 2004 Georgia Southern Eagles football team represented the Georgia Southern Eagles of Georgia Southern University during the 2004 NCAA Division I-AA football season. The Eagles played their home games at Paulson Stadium in Statesboro, Georgia. The team was coached by Mike Sewak, in his third year as head coach for the Eagles.

== Schedule ==
Date	Time	Opponent	Rank	Site	TV	Result	Attendance	Source
September 4	3:00 pm	at No. 3 (I-A) Georgia*	No. 10	Sanford Stadium; Athens, GA	FSN	L 28–48	92,746	
September 11	6:00 pm	Johnson C. Smith*	No. 10	Paulson Stadium; Statesboro, GA		W 84–3	14,812	
September 18	7:30 pm	No. 3 Wofford	No. 8	Paulson Stadium; Statesboro, GA		W 58–14	17,170	
September 25	4:00 pm	at Chattanooga	No. 4	Finley Stadium; Chattanooga, TN		W 51–17	6,160	
October 2	1:00 pm	Elon	No. 3	Paulson Stadium; Statesboro, GA		W 48–14	12,821	
October 9	4:00 pm	at Western Carolina	No. 3	E.J. Whitmire Stadium; Cullowhee, NC		W 38–16	10,970	
October 16	12:00 pm	No. 15 Appalachian State	No. 2	Paulson Stadium; Statesboro, GA (rivalry)	CSS	W 54–7	22,421	
October 23	2:00 pm	at The Citadel	No. 2	Johnson Hagood Stadium; Charleston, SC		W 42–7	12,472	
October 30	1:00 pm	South Dakota State*	No. 2	Paulson Stadium; Statesboro, GA		W 63–7	17,463	
November 6	3:00 pm	at No. 3 Furman	No. 2	Paladin Stadium; Greenville, SC		L 22–29	17,145	
November 13	11:00 am	at FIU*	No. 6	FIU Stadium; Miami, FL		W 53–32	7,876	
November 27	6:00 pm	No. 5 New Hampshire*	No. 4	Paulson Stadium; Statesboro, GA (NCAA Division I-AA First Round)		L 23–27	6,053	
*Non-conference game; Rankings from The Sports Network Poll released prior to the game; All times are in Eastern time
