= 2004 Charleston Southern Buccaneers football team =

American college football season

2004 Charleston Southern Buccaneers football
- Conference: Big South Conference
- Record: 5–5 (1–3 Big South)
- Head coach: Jay Mills (2nd season)
- Offensive coordinator: Jamey Chadwell (1st season)
- Defensive coordinator: Steve Barrows (2nd season)
- Home stadium: Buccaneer Field

2004 Big South Conference football standings
	Conf.			Overall
Team	W		L	W		L
No. 24 Coastal Carolina $	4	–	0	10	–	1
Liberty	3	–	1	6	–	5
Gardner–Webb	2	–	2	5	–	6
Charleston Southern	1	–	3	5	–	5
VMI	0	–	4	0	–	11
$ – Conference champion; Rankings from The Sports Network poll

The 2004 Charleston Southern Buccaneers football team represented Charleston Southern University as a member of the Big South Conference during the 2004 NCAA Division I-AA football season. Led by second-year head coach Jay Mills, the Buccaneers compiled an overall record of 5–5 with a mark of 1–3 in conference play, finishing fourth place in the Big South.

== Schedule ==
Date	Time	Opponent	Site	Result	Attendance	Source
September 4		at The Citadel*	Johnson Hagood Stadium; Charleston, SC	Canceled (Note: The Buccaneers first game of the season against The Citadel was cancelled due to Hurricane Gaston.)	N/A	
September 11	1:30 pm	at Presbyterian*	Bailey Memorial Stadium; Clinton, SC	L 14–19	2,548	
September 18	12:30 pm	at Jacksonville*	D. B. Milne Field; Jacksonville, FL	W 38–3	2,809	
September 25	1:30 pm	Charleston (WV)*	Buccaneer Field; Charleston, SC	W 38–21	2,218	
October 2	1:30 pm	VMI	Buccaneer Field; Charleston, SC	W 25–24	2,181	
October 9	1:00 pm	at Howard*	William H. Greene Stadium; Washington, DC	L 6–24	2,079	
October 23	1:30 pm	North Greenville*	Buccaneer Field; Charleston, SC	W 55–7	2,817	
October 30	1:30 pm	at Liberty	Williams Stadium; Lynchburg, VA	L 6–34	5,717	
November 6	1:30 pm	Allen*	Buccaneer Field; Charleston, SC	W 55–6	1,268	
November 13	12:00 pm	Gardner–Webb	Buccaneer Field; Charleston, SC	L 0–18	2,112	
November 20	7:00 pm	at No. 21 Coastal Carolina	Brooks Stadium; Conway, SC	L 28–56	6,492	
*Non-conference game; Rankings from The Sports Network Poll released prior to the game; All times are in Eastern time
