= 2004 Mississippi Valley State Delta Devils football team =

American college football season

2004 Mississippi Valley State Delta Devils football
- Conference: Southwestern Athletic Conference
- East Division
- Record: 3–8 (2–7 SWAC)
- Head coach: Willie Totten (3rd season)
- Defensive coordinator: Sam Washington (3rd season)
- Home stadium: Rice–Totten Stadium

2004 Southwestern Athletic Conference football standings
	Conf.			Overall
Team	W		L	W		L
East
No. 20 Alabama State xy$	6	–	1	10	–	2
Alabama A&M	5	–	2	7	–	4
Alcorn State	4	–	3	7	–	4
Jackson State	3	–	4	4	–	7
Mississippi Valley State	1	–	6	3	–	8
West
Southern xy	6	–	1	8	–	4
Arkansas–Pine Bluff	5	–	2	6	–	3
Grambling State	3	–	4	6	–	5
Prairie View A&M	1	–	6	3	–	8
Texas Southern	0	–	7	0	–	11
Championship: Alabama State 40, Southern 35
$ – Conference champion; x – Division champion/co-champions; y – Championship game participant; Rankings from The Sports Network Poll

The 2004 Mississippi Valley State Delta Devils football team represented Mississippi Valley State University as a member of the Southwestern Athletic Conference (SWAC) during the 2004 NCAA Division I-AA football season. Led by third-year head coach Willie Totten, the Delta Devils compiled an overall record of 3–8 and a mark of 2–7 in conference play, and finished last in the SWAC East Division.

== Schedule ==
Date	Opponent	Site	Result	Source
September 4	Arkansas–Pine Bluff	Rice–Totten Stadium; Itta Bena, MS	L 14–49	
September 11	at Southern	A. W. Mumford Stadium; Baton Rouge, LA	L 14–17	
September 18	at Alabama A&M	Louis Crews Stadium; Normal, AL	L 20–30	
September 25	at Jackson State	Mississippi Veterans Memorial Stadium; Jackson, MS	L 16–31	
October 2	at Southeastern Louisiana*	Strawberry Stadium; Hammond, LA	L 17–33	
October 9	Grambling State	Rice–Totten Stadium; Itta Bena, MS	L 26–34	
October 16	Paul Quinn*	Rice–Totten Stadium; Itta Bena, MS	W 48–7	
October 23	at Texas Southern	Robertson Stadium; Houston, TX	W 15–14	
October 30	Prairie View A&M	Rice–Totten Stadium; Itta Bena, MS	W 42–34	
November 6	Alcorn State	Rice–Totten Stadium; Itta Bena, MS	L 30–31	
November 13	at Alabama State	Cramton Bowl; Montgomery, AL	L 6–34	
*Non-conference game
