= 2004 Furman Paladins football team =

American college football season

2004 Furman Paladins football

SoCon co-champion

NCAA Division I-AA Quarterfinal, L 13–14 vs. James Madison
- Conference: Southern Conference

Ranking
- Sports Network: No. 5
- Record: 10–3 (6–1 SoCon)
- Head coach: Bobby Lamb (3rd season)
- Captains: Mike Killian; Cam Newton; Brian Bratton; Ben Bainbridge
- Home stadium: Paladin Stadium

2004 Southern Conference football standings
	Conf.			Overall
Team	W		L	W		L
No. 5 Furman +^	6	–	1	10	–	3
No. 10 Georgia Southern +^	6	–	1	9	–	3
No. 18 Wofford	4	–	3	8	–	3
Appalachian State	4	–	3	6	–	5
Western Carolina	2	–	5	4	–	7
The Citadel	2	–	5	3	–	7
Elon	2	–	5	3	–	8
Chattanooga	2	–	5	2	–	9
+ – Conference co-champions; ^ – NCAA Division I-AA playoff participant; Rankings from The Sports Network poll

The 2004 Furman Paladins football team represented the Furman University as a member of the Southern Conference (SoCon) during the 2004 NCAA Division I-AA football season. Led by third-year head coach Bobby Lamb, the Paladins compiled an overall record of 10–3 with a mark of 6–1 in conference play, sharing the SoCon title with Georgia Southern. Furman advanced to the NCAA Division I-AA Football Championship playoffs, where they beat Jacksonville State in the first round before losing to the eventual national champion, James Madison, in the quarterfinals.

== Schedule ==
Date	Opponent	Rank	Site	TV	Result	Attendance	Source
September 4	Presbyterian*	No. 7	Paladin Stadium; Greenville, SC		W 52–7	12,817	
September 11	at Samford*	No. 5	Seibert Stadium; Homewood, AL		W 45–10	9,053	
September 18	at Gardner–Webb*	No. 4	Ernest W. Spangler Stadium; Boiling Springs, NC		W 36–6	6,009	
September 25	at Pittsburgh*	No. 2	Heinz Field; Pittsburgh, PA		L 38–41 ^{OT}	35,121	
October 2	Western Carolina	No. 2	Paladin Stadium; Greenville, SC		W 31–10	14,412	
October 9	at No. 21 Appalachian State	No. 2	Kidd Brewer Stadium; Boone, NC	FSNS	L 29–30	15,311	
October 16	The Citadel	No. 8	Paladin Stadium; Greenville, SC (rivalry)		W 33–14	14,481	
October 23	at Elon	No. 7	Rhodes Stadium; Elon, NC		W 10–0	4,872	
November 6	No. 2 Georgia Southern	No. 3	Paladin Stadium; Greenville, SC		W 29–22	17,145	
November 13	at No. 12 Wofford	No. 2	Gibbs Stadium; Spartanburg, SC (rivalry)		W 31–24	12,042	
November 20	Chattanooga	No. 2	Paladin Stadium; Greenville, SC		W 51–31	11,692	
November 27	No. 13 Jacksonville State*	No. 2	Paladin Stadium; Greenville, SC (NCAA Division I-AA First Round)		W 49–7	7,051	
December 4	No. 8 James Madison*	No. 2	Paladin Stadium; Greenville, SC (NCAA Division I-AA Quarterfinal)	ESPNGP	L 13–14	8,812	
*Non-conference game; Rankings from The Sports Network Poll released prior to the game
