= 2006 Alcorn State Braves football team =

American college football season

2006 Alcorn State Braves football
- Conference: Southwestern Athletic Conference
- East Division
- Record: 6–5 (5–4 SWAC)
- Head coach: Johnny Thomas (9th season)
- Offensive coordinator: John McKenzie (7th season)
- Home stadium: Jack Spinks Stadium

2006 Southwestern Athletic Conference football standings
| | Conf. | | | Overall |
| Team | W | | L | W | | L |
|---|---|---|---|---|---|---|
East Division
| Alabama A&M xy$ | 6 | – | 3 | 9 | – | 3 |
| Jackson State | 5 | – | 4 | 6 | – | 5 |
| Alcorn State | 5 | – | 4 | 6 | – | 5 |
| Mississippi Valley State | 5 | – | 4 | 6 | – | 5 |
| Alabama State | 5 | – | 4 | 5 | – | 6 |
West Division
| Arkansas–Pine Bluff xy | 7 | – | 2 | 8 | – | 4 |
| Southern | 4 | – | 5 | 5 | – | 6 |
| Grambling State | 3 | – | 6 | 3 | – | 8 |
| Texas Southern | 3 | – | 6 | 3 | – | 8 |
| Prairie View A&M | 2 | – | 7 | 3 | – | 7 |
Championship: Alabama A&M 22, Arkansas–Pine Bluff 13
$ – Conference champion; x – Division champion/co-champions; y – Championship game participant

The 2006 Alcorn State Braves football team represented Alcorn State University as a member of the Southwestern Athletic Conference (SWAC) during the 2006 NCAA Division I FCS football season. Led by ninth-year head coach Johnny Thomas, the Braves compiled an overall record of 6–5, with a conference record of 5–4, and finished tied for second in the SWAC East Division.

== Schedule ==
| Date | Opponent | Site | Result | Attendance | Source |
|---|---|---|---|---|---|
| August 31 | at Louisiana–Monroe* | Malone Stadium; Monroe, LA | L 6–24 | 18,106 | |
| September 9 | at Arkansas–Pine Bluff | Golden Lion Stadium; Pine Bluff, AR | L 14–42 | | |
| September 23 | Alabama State | Jack Spinks Stadium; Lorman, MS | L 28–33 | | |
| September 30 | vs. Morehouse* | Los Angeles Memorial Coliseum; Los Angeles, CA (Silver Dollar Classic) | W 23–6 | 10,012 | |
| October 5 | at Prairie View A&M | Edward L. Blackshear Field; Prairie View, TX | W 17–14 | | |
| October 14 | Texas Southern | Jack Spinks Stadium; Lorman, MS | W 44–23 | 11,797 | |
| October 21 | Southern | Jack Spinks Stadium; Lorman, MS | W 26–10 | | |
| November 4 | at Mississippi Valley State | Rice–Totten Stadium; Itta Bena, MS | L 25–28 | | |
| November 11 | at Alabama A&M | Louis Crews Stadium; Normal, AL | L 26–35 | | |
| November 18 | at Jackson State | Mississippi Veterans Memorial Stadium; Jackson, MS (Soul Bowl) | W 32–31 | | |
| December 2 | at Grambling State | Eddie G. Robinson Memorial Stadium; Grambling, LA | W 21–14 | 2,383 | |
*Non-conference game
