= 2006 Arkansas–Pine Bluff Golden Lions football team =

American college football season

2006 Arkansas–Pine Bluff Golden Lions football

SWAC West Division champion

SWAC Championship Game, L 13–22 vs. Alabama A&M
- Conference: Southwestern Athletic Conference
- West Division
- Record: 8–4 (7–2 SWAC)
- Head coach: Mo Forte (3rd season)
- Home stadium: Golden Lion Stadium

2006 Southwestern Athletic Conference football standings
	Conf.			Overall
Team	W		L	W		L
East Division
Alabama A&M xy$	6	–	3	9	–	3
Jackson State	5	–	4	6	–	5
Alcorn State	5	–	4	6	–	5
Mississippi Valley State	5	–	4	6	–	5
Alabama State	5	–	4	5	–	6
West Division
Arkansas–Pine Bluff xy	7	–	2	8	–	4
Southern	4	–	5	5	–	6
Grambling State	3	–	6	3	–	8
Texas Southern	3	–	6	3	–	8
Prairie View A&M	2	–	7	3	–	7
Championship: Alabama A&M 22, Arkansas–Pine Bluff 13
$ – Conference champion; x – Division champion/co-champions; y – Championship game participant

The 2006 Arkansas–Pine Bluff Golden Lions football team represented the University of Arkansas at Pine Bluff as a member of the Southwestern Athletic Conference (SWAC) during the 2006 NCAA Division I FCS football season. Led by third-year head coach Mo Forte, the Golden Lions compiled an overall record of 8–4, with a mark of 7–2 in conference play, and finished first in the SWAC West Division.

== Schedule ==
Date	Opponent	Site	Result	Attendance	Source
September 2	vs. Mississippi Valley State	Soldier Field; Chicago, IL (Chicago Football Classic)	L 0–10	40,000	
September 9	Alcorn State	Golden Lion Stadium; Pine Bluff, AR	W 42–14		
September 16	at Alabama State	Cramton Bowl; Montgomery, AL	L 13–31		
September 23	No. 10 Southern Illinois*	Golden Lion Stadium; Pine Bluff, AR	L 16–48	3,910	
September 30	vs. Tuskegee*	Edward Jones Dome; St. Louis, MO (Gateway Classic)	W 35–19		
October 14	vs. Grambling State	War Memorial Stadium; Little Rock, AR (Delta Classic)	W 33–28	30,216	
October 21	Alabama A&M	Golden Lion Stadium; Pine Bluff, AR	W 23–21		
October 28	Jackson State	Golden Lion Stadium; Pine Bluff, AR	W 43–40	6,556	
November 4	at Prairie View A&M	Edward L. Blackshear Field; Prairie View, TX	W 28–21		
November 11	at Southern	A. W. Mumford Stadium; Baton Rouge, LA	W 45–20		
November 18	Texas Southern	Golden Lion Stadium; Pine Bluff, AR	W 42–31	12,890	
December 16	vs. Alabama A&M	Legion Field; Birmingham, AL (SWAC Championship Game)	L 13–22	30,213	
*Non-conference game; Rankings from The Sports Network Poll released prior to the game
