= 2004 Alabama A&M Bulldogs football team =

American college football season

2004 Alabama A&M Bulldogs football
- Conference: Southwestern Athletic Conference
- East Division
- Record: 7–4 (5–2 SWAC)
- Head coach: Anthony Jones (3rd season)
- Home stadium: Louis Crews Stadium

2004 Southwestern Athletic Conference football standings
	Conf.			Overall
Team	W		L	W		L
East
No. 20 Alabama State xy$	6	–	1	10	–	2
Alabama A&M	5	–	2	7	–	4
Alcorn State	4	–	3	7	–	4
Jackson State	3	–	4	4	–	7
Mississippi Valley State	1	–	6	3	–	8
West
Southern xy	6	–	1	8	–	4
Arkansas–Pine Bluff	5	–	2	6	–	3
Grambling State	3	–	4	6	–	5
Prairie View A&M	1	–	6	3	–	8
Texas Southern	0	–	7	0	–	11
Championship: Alabama State 40, Southern 35
$ – Conference champion; x – Division champion/co-champions; y – Championship game participant; Rankings from The Sports Network Poll

The 2004 Alabama A&M Bulldogs football team represented Alabama A&M University as a member of the Southwestern Athletic Conference (SWAC) during the 2004 NCAA Division I-AA football season. Led by third-year head coach Anthony Jones, the Bulldogs compiled an overall record of 7–4, with a conference record of 5–2, and finished second in the SWAC East Division.

== Schedule ==
Date	Opponent	Site	Result	Attendance	Source
September 4	at Tennessee State*	the Coliseum; Nashville, TN	L 7–42	25,117	
September 11	Grambling State	Louis Crews Stadium; Normal, AL	W 21–9	10,235	
September 18	Mississippi Valley State	Louis Crews Stadium; Normal, AL	W 30–20		
September 25	vs. Arkansas–Pine Bluff	Edward Jones Dome; St. Louis, MO (Gateway Classic)	L 10–24		
October 2	at Texas Southern	Robertson Stadium; Houston, TX	W 22–3		
October 9	Southern	Louis Crews Stadium; Normal, AL	L 24–33		
October 16	vs. Savannah State*	Augusta, GA	W 44–12		
October 30	vs. Alabama State	Legion Field; Birmingham, AL (Magic City Classic)	L 20–24		
November 6	at Jackson State	Mississippi Veterans Memorial Stadium; Jackson, MS	W 22–6		
November 13	Alcorn State	Louis Crews Stadium; Normal, AL	W 27–21		
November 20	Prairie View A&M	Louis Crews Stadium; Normal, AL	W 42–6		
*Non-conference game
