= 2004 Southern Jaguars football team =

American college football season

2004 Southern Jaguars football

SWAC West Division champion

SWAC Football Championship Game, L 35–40 vs. Alabama State
- Conference: Southwestern Athletic Conference
- West Division
- Record: 8–4 (7–2 SWAC)
- Head coach: Pete Richardson (12th season)
- Defensive coordinator: Terrence Graves (1st season)
- Home stadium: A. W. Mumford Stadium

2004 Southwestern Athletic Conference football standings
	Conf.			Overall
Team	W		L	W		L
East
No. 20 Alabama State xy$	6	–	1	10	–	2
Alabama A&M	5	–	2	7	–	4
Alcorn State	4	–	3	7	–	4
Jackson State	3	–	4	4	–	7
Mississippi Valley State	1	–	6	3	–	8
West
Southern xy	6	–	1	8	–	4
Arkansas–Pine Bluff	5	–	2	6	–	3
Grambling State	3	–	4	6	–	5
Prairie View A&M	1	–	6	3	–	8
Texas Southern	0	–	7	0	–	11
Championship: Alabama State 40, Southern 35
$ – Conference champion; x – Division champion/co-champions; y – Championship game participant; Rankings from The Sports Network Poll

The 2004 Southern Jaguars football team represented Southern University as a member of the Southwestern Athletic Conference (SWAC) during the 2004 NCAA Division I-AA football season. Led by 12th-year head coach Pete Richardson, the Jaguars compiled an overall record of 8–4, with a conference record of 7–2, and finished and finished first in the SWAC West Division.

== Schedule ==
Date	Time	Opponent	Rank	Site	Result	Attendance	Source
September 4		No. 8 McNeese State*		A. W. Mumford Stadium; Baton Rouge, LA	L 18–35	21,673	
September 11		Mississippi Valley State		A. W. Mumford Stadium; Baton Rouge, LA	W 17–14		
September 18		at Prairie View A&M		Reliant Stadium; Houston, TX	W 42–12		
September 25	7:00 p.m.	South Dakota State*		A. W. Mumford Stadium; Baton Rouge, LA	L 24–31	16,445	
October 2		at Alabama State		Cramton Bowl; Montgomery, AL	W 42–41		
October 9		at Alabama A&M		Louis Crews Stadium; Normal, AL	W 33–24		
October 16		vs. Jackson State		Louisiana Superdome; New Orleans, LA (rivalry)	W 45–7		
October 23		at Alcorn State		Jack Spinks Stadium; Lorman, MS	W 23–20		
October 30		Texas College*		A. W. Mumford Stadium; Baton Rouge, LA	W 50–17	27,765	
November 13		Texas Southern		A. W. Mumford Stadium; Baton Rouge, LA	W 28–0		
November 27		vs. Grambling State	No. 20	Louisiana Superdome; New Orleans, LA (Bayou Classic)	L 13–24	68,911	
December 11		vs. No. 20 Alabama State		Legion Field; Birmingham, AL (SWAC Championship Game)	L 35–40	22,327	
*Non-conference game; Rankings from The Sports Network Poll released prior to the game; All times are in Central time
