= 2004 Prairie View A&M Panthers football team =

American college football season

2004 Prairie View A&M Panthers football
- Conference: Southwestern Athletic Conference
- West Division
- Record: 3–8 (1–6 SWAC)
- Head coach: Henry Frazier III (1st season)
- Offensive coordinator: Marcus Arroyo (1st season)
- Home stadium: Edward L. Blackshear Field; Reliant Stadium

2004 Southwestern Athletic Conference football standings
	Conf.			Overall
Team	W		L	W		L
East
No. 20 Alabama State xy$	6	–	1	10	–	2
Alabama A&M	5	–	2	7	–	4
Alcorn State	4	–	3	7	–	4
Jackson State	3	–	4	4	–	7
Mississippi Valley State	1	–	6	3	–	8
West
Southern xy	6	–	1	8	–	4
Arkansas–Pine Bluff	5	–	2	6	–	3
Grambling State	3	–	4	6	–	5
Prairie View A&M	1	–	6	3	–	8
Texas Southern	0	–	7	0	–	11
Championship: Alabama State 40, Southern 35
$ – Conference champion; x – Division champion/co-champions; y – Championship game participant; Rankings from The Sports Network Poll

The 2004 Prairie View A&M Panthers football team represented Prairie View A&M University as a member of the Southwestern Athletic Conference (SWAC) during the 2004 NCAA Division I-AA football season. Led by first-year head coach Henry Frazier III, the Panthers compiled an overall record of 3–8, with a mark of 1–6 in conference play, and finished fourth in the SWAC West Division.

== Schedule ==
Date	Opponent	Site	Result	Attendance	Source
August 30	vs. Texas Southern	Reliant Stadium; Houston, TX (Labor Day Classic)	W 25–7		
September 11	at Paul Quinn*	Dallas, TX	W 31–12		
September 18	Southern	Reliant Stadium; Houston, TX	L 12–42		
October 2	vs. Grambling State	Cotton Bowl; Dallas, TX (rivalry)	L 32–53	61,642	
October 9	Alcorn State	Edward L. Blackshear Field; Prairie View, TX	L 15–26		
October 16	Alabama State	Edward L. Blackshear Field; Prairie View, TX	L 20–42	2,102	
October 23	Lincoln (MO)*	Edward L. Blackshear Field; Prairie View, TX	W 20–14		
October 30	at Mississippi Valley State	Rice–Totten Stadium; Itta Bena, MS	L 34–42		
November 6	at Arkansas–Pine Bluff	Golden Lion Stadium; Pine Bluff, AR	L 23–24		
November 13	Jackson State	Edward L. Blackshear Field; Prairie View, TX	L 28–45		
November 20	at Alabama A&M	Louis Crews Stadium; Normal, AL	L 6–42		
*Non-conference game
