= 2004 Wofford Terriers football team =

American college football season

2004 Wofford Terriers football
- Conference: Southern Conference

Ranking
- Sports Network: No. 18
- Record: 8–3 (4–3 SoCon)
- Head coach: Mike Ayers (17th season)
- Home stadium: Gibbs Stadium

2004 Southern Conference football standings
	Conf.			Overall
Team	W		L	W		L
No. 5 Furman $^	6	–	1	10	–	3
No. 10 Georgia Southern $^	6	–	1	9	–	3
No. 18 Wofford	4	–	3	8	–	3
Appalachian State	4	–	3	6	–	5
Western Carolina	2	–	5	4	–	7
The Citadel	2	–	5	3	–	7
Elon	2	–	5	3	–	8
Chattanooga	2	–	5	2	–	9
$ – Conference champion; ^ – NCAA Division I-AA playoff participant; Rankings from The Sports Network I-AA Poll

The 2004 Wofford Terriers football team was an American football team that represented Wofford College as a member of the Southern Conference (SoCon) during the 2004 NCAA Division I-AA football season. Led by 17th-year head coach Mike Ayers, the Terriers compiled and overall record of 8–3, with a mark of 4–3 in conference play, and finished tied for third in the SoCon.

== Schedule ==
Date	Time	Opponent	Rank	Site	TV	Result	Attendance	Source
September 11	7:00 p.m.	at South Carolina State*	No. 3	Oliver C. Dawson Stadium; Orangeburg, SC		W 24–22	6,619	
September 18	7:30 p.m.	at No. 8 Georgia Southern	No. 3	Paulson Stadium; Statesboro, GA		L 14–58	17,170	
September 25	7:00 p.m.	Johnson C. Smith*	No. 9	Gibbs Stadium; Spartanburg, SC		W 56–0	6,012	
October 2	7:00 p.m.	Chattanooga	No. 9	Gibbs Stadium; Spartanburg, SC		W 56–21	5,811	
October 9	6:00 p.m.	at Elon	No. 8	Rhodes Stadium; Elon, NC		W 27–13	5,226	
October 16	1:30 p.m.	Western Carolina	No. 6	Gibbs Stadium; Spartanburg, SC		W 15–12	8,771	
October 23	3:00 p.m.	at No. 23 Appalachian State	No. 5	Kidd Brewer Stadium; Boone, NC	CSTV	L 17–38	19,777	
October 30	1:30 p.m.	The Citadel	No. 11	Gibbs Stadium; Spartanburg, SC (rivalry)		W 38–17	9,019	
November 6	12:30 p.m.	Gardner–Webb*	No. 10	Gibbs Stadium; Spartanburg, SC		W 49–17	6,648	
November 13	1:00 p.m.	No. 2 Furman	No. 12	Gibbs Stadium; Spartanburg, SC (rivalry)		L 24–31	12,042	
November 20	1:00 p.m.	at VMI*	No. 17	Alumni Memorial Field; Lexington, VA		W 19–18	4,317	
*Non-conference game; Rankings from The Sports Network Poll released prior to the game; All times are in Eastern time
