= 2004 Howard Bison football team =

American college football season

2004 Howard Bison football
- Conference: Mid-Eastern Athletic Conference
- Record: 6–5 (3–4 MEAC)
- Head coach: Rayford Petty (3rd season)
- Home stadium: William H. Greene Stadium

2004 Mid-Eastern Athletic Conference football standings
	Conf.			Overall
Team	W		L	W		L
No. 12 Hampton +^	6	–	1	10	–	2
No. 22 South Carolina State +	6	–	1	9	–	2
Bethune–Cookman	4	–	3	6	–	4
Delaware State	4	–	3	4	–	7
Howard	3	–	4	6	–	5
Morgan State	3	–	4	5	–	6
North Carolina A&T	1	–	6	3	–	8
Norfolk State	1	–	6	1	–	8
+ – Conference co-champions; ^ – NCAA Division I-AA playoff participant; Rankings from The Sports Network poll

The 2004 Howard Bison football team represented Howard University as a member of the Mid-Eastern Athletic Conference (MEAC) during the 2004 NCAA Division I-AA football season. Led by third-year head coach Rayford Petty, the Bison compiled an overall record of 6–5, with a conference record of 3–4, and finished tied for fifth in the MEAC.

== Schedule ==
Date	Opponent	Site	Result	Attendance	Source
September 4	vs. Alabama State*	Ford Field; Detroit, MI (Detroit Classic)	L 12–27	45,713	
September 11	at Hampton	Armstrong Stadium; Hampton, VA (rivalry)	L 14–47	17,520	
September 18	vs. Alcorn State*	FedExField; Landover, MD (Prince George's Classic)	W 17–10		
September 25	Savannah State*	William H. Greene Stadium; Washington, DC	W 53–7		
October 9	Charleston Southern*	William H. Greene Stadium; Washington, DC	W 24–6	2,079	
October 16	Morgan State	William H. Greene Stadium; Washington, DC (rivalry)	W 42–35 ^{OT}	9,804	
October 23	at North Carolina A&T	Aggie Stadium; Greensboro, NC	L 13–14 ^{OT}	12,220	
October 30	Norfolk State	William H. Greene Stadium; Washington, DC	W 35–17	12,804	
November 6	at South Carolina State	Oliver C. Dawson Stadium; Orangeburg, SC	L 16–23		
November 13	at Bethune–Cookman	Municipal Stadium; Daytona Beach, FL	W 10–7	4,165	
November 20	Delaware State	William H. Greene Stadium; Washington, DC	L 13–32	1,065	
*Non-conference game
