= 2004 Delaware State Hornets football team =

American college football season

2004 Delaware State Hornets football
- Conference: Mid-Eastern Athletic Conference
- Record: 4–7 (4–3 MEAC)
- Head coach: Al Lavan (1st season)
- Home stadium: Alumni Stadium

2004 Mid-Eastern Athletic Conference football standings
| | Conf. | | | Overall |
| Team | W | | L | W | | L |
|---|---|---|---|---|---|---|
| No. 12 Hampton +^ | 6 | – | 1 | 10 | – | 2 |
| No. 22 South Carolina State + | 6 | – | 1 | 9 | – | 2 |
| Bethune–Cookman | 4 | – | 3 | 6 | – | 4 |
| Delaware State | 4 | – | 3 | 4 | – | 7 |
| Howard | 3 | – | 4 | 6 | – | 5 |
| Morgan State | 3 | – | 4 | 5 | – | 6 |
| North Carolina A&T | 1 | – | 6 | 3 | – | 8 |
| Norfolk State | 1 | – | 6 | 1 | – | 8 |
+ – Conference co-champions; ^ – NCAA Division I-AA playoff participant; Rankings from The Sports Network poll

The 2004 Delaware State Hornets football team represented Delaware State University as a member of the Mid-Eastern Athletic Conference (MEAC) in the 2004 NCAA Division I-AA football season. The Hornets were led by first-year head coach Al Lavan and played their home games at Alumni Stadium. They finished the season 4–7 overall and 4–3 in conference play to place in fourth in the MEAC.

== Schedule ==
| Date | Time | Opponent | Site | Result | Attendance | Source |
|---|---|---|---|---|---|---|
| September 4 | 1:00 p.m. | No. 19 UMass* | Alumni Stadium; Dover, DE | L 0–51 | 1,750 | |
| September 11 | 2:00 p.m. | North Carolina Central* | Alumni Stadium; Dover, DE | L 23–26 | 1,750 | |
| September 18 | 2:00 p.m. | at Elon* | Rhodes Stadium; Elon, NC | L 13–49 | 6,935 | |
| September 25 | 1:00 p.m. | No. 1 Southern Illinois* | Alumni Stadium; Dover, DE | L 0–49 | 1,734 | |
| October 2 | 1:00 p.m. | No. 17 Hampton | Alumni Stadium; Dover, DE | W 28–23 | 1,972 | |
| October 9 | 1:00 p.m. | at Bethune–Cookman | Daytona Stadium; Daytona Beach, FL | L 16–45 | 13,481 | |
| October 16 | 1:00 p.m. | North Carolina A&T | Alumni Stadium; Dover, DE | W 15–6 | 2,816 | |
| October 23 | 1:00 p.m. | at Morgan State | Hughes Stadium; Baltimore, MD | L 30–34 | 14,479 | |
| October 30 | 1:00 p.m. | South Carolina State | Alumni Stadium; Dover, DE | L 14–28 | 6,583 | |
| November 13 | 1:00 p.m. | at Norfolk State | William "Dick" Price Stadium; Norfolk, VA | W 33–28 | 2,060 | |
| November 20 | 1:00 p.m. | at Howard | William H. Greene Stadium; Washington, DC | W 32–13 | 1,065 | |
*Non-conference game; Rankings from The Sports Network Poll released prior to the game; All times are in Eastern time
