= 2004 Eastern Illinois Panthers football team =

American college football season

2004 Eastern Illinois Panthers football
- Conference: Ohio Valley Conference
- Record: 5–6 (4–4 OVC)
- Head coach: Bob Spoo (18th season)
- Defensive coordinator: Roc Bellantoni (3rd season)
- Home stadium: O'Brien Stadium

2004 Ohio Valley Conference football standings
	Conf.			Overall
Team	W		L	W		L
No. 14 Jacksonville State $^	7	–	1	9	–	2
Murray State	6	–	2	7	–	4
Eastern Kentucky	6	–	2	6	–	5
Eastern Illinois	4	–	4	5	–	6
Tennessee Tech	3	–	4	6	–	5
Samford	3	–	5	4	–	7
Southeast Missouri State	3	–	5	3	–	8
Tennessee State	2	–	5	4	–	7
Tennessee–Martin	1	–	7	2	–	9
$ – Conference champion; ^ – NCAA Division I-AA playoff participant; Rankings from The Sports Network poll

The 2004 Eastern Illinois Panthers football team represented Eastern Illinois University as a member of the Ohio Valley Conference (OVC) during the 2004 NCAA Division I-AA football season. Led by 18th-year head coach Bob Spoo, the Panthers compiled an overall record of 5–6 with a mark of 4–4 in conference play, placing fourth in the OVC. Eastern Illinois played their home games at O'Brien Stadium in Charleston, Illinois.

== Schedule ==
Date	Opponent	Site	Result	Attendance	Source
September 11	Indiana State*	O'Brien Stadium; Charleston, IL	L 30–33 ^{OT}		
September 18	at Illinois State*	Hancock Stadium; Normal, IL (rivalry)	L 31–35	9,152	
September 25	at Eastern Michigan*	Rynearson Stadium; Normal, IL	W 31–28		
October 2	Southeast Missouri State	O'Brien Stadium; Charleston, IL	W 35–28		
October 9	at Eastern Kentucky	Roy Kidd Stadium; Richmond, KY	L 9–49		
October 16	Murray State	O'Brien Stadium; Charleston, IL	W 24–9		
October 23	at Tennessee–Martin	Graham Stadium; Martin, TN	L 14–32		
October 30	Tennessee State	O'Brien Stadium; Charleston, IL	W 34–24	5,422	
November 6	at Tennessee Tech	Tucker Stadium; Cookeville, TN	L 37–40 ^{OT}		
November 13	No. 14 Jacksonville State	O'Brien Stadium; Charleston, IL	L 21–31	2,019	
November 20	at Samford	Seibert Stadium; Homewood, AL	W 28–14	2,497	
*Non-conference game; Rankings from The Sports Network Poll released prior to the game
