= 2004 Chattanooga Mocs football team =

American college football season

2004 Chattanooga Mocs football
- Conference: Southern Conference
- Record: 2–9 (2–5 SoCon)
- Head coach: Rodney Allison (2nd season)
- Offensive coordinator: Jason Simpson (2nd season)
- Defensive coordinator: Gwaine Mathews (2nd season)
- Home stadium: Finley Stadium

2004 Southern Conference football standings
	Conf.			Overall
Team	W		L	W		L
No. 5 Furman $^	6	–	1	10	–	3
No. 10 Georgia Southern $^	6	–	1	9	–	3
No. 18 Wofford	4	–	3	8	–	3
Appalachian State	4	–	3	6	–	5
Western Carolina	2	–	5	4	–	7
The Citadel	2	–	5	3	–	7
Elon	2	–	5	3	–	8
Chattanooga	2	–	5	2	–	9
$ – Conference champion; ^ – NCAA Division I-AA playoff participant; Rankings from The Sports Network I-AA Poll

The 2004 Chattanooga Mocs football team represented the University of Tennessee at Chattanooga as a member of the Southern Conference (SoCon) in the 2004 NCAA Division I-AA football season. The Mocs were led by second-year head coach Rodney Allison and played their home games at Finley Stadium. They finished the season 2–9 overall and 2–5 in SoCon play to tied for fifth place.

== Schedule ==
Date	Time	Opponent	Site	Result	Attendance	Source
September 11	8:00 p.m.	at Memphis*	Liberty Bowl Memorial Stadium; Memphis, TN	L 21–52	38,133	
September 18	6:00 p.m.	Jacksonville State*	Finley Stadium; Chattanooga, TN	L 20–65	6,642	
September 25	4:00 p.m.	No. 3 Georgia Southern	Finley Stadium; Chattanooga, TN	L 17–51	6,160	
October 2	7:00 p.m.	at No. 9 Wofford	Gibbs Stadium; Spartanburg, SC	L 21–56	5,811	
October 9	7:00 p.m.	at Tennessee Tech*	Tucker Stadium; Cookeville, TN	L 34–52	3,894	
October 16	4:00 p.m.	Elon^{†}	Finley Stadium; Chattanooga, TN	L 26–35	6,246	
October 23	2:00 p.m.	at Western Carolina	E. J. Whitmire Stadium; Cullowhee, NC	W 27–24	8,743	
October 30	6:00 p.m.	No. 17 Appalachian State	Finley Stadium; Chattanooga, TN	W 59–56	4,486	
November 6	2:00 p.m.	at The Citadel	Johnson Hagood Stadium; Charleston, SC	L 24–44	11,962	
November 13	1:30 p.m.	Liberty*	Finley Stadium; Chattanooga, TN	L 40–43	4,706	
November 20	2:00 p.m.	at Furman	Paladin Stadium; Greenville, SC	L 31–51	11,692	
*Non-conference game; ^{†}Homecoming; Rankings from The Sports Network Poll released prior to the game; All times are in Eastern time
