= 2006 Alabama State Hornets football team =

American college football season

2006 Alabama State Hornets football
- Conference: Southwestern Athletic Conference
- East Division
- Record: 5–6 (5–4 SWAC)
- Head coach: Charles Coe (4th season)
- Home stadium: Cramton Bowl

2006 Southwestern Athletic Conference football standings
	Conf.			Overall
Team	W		L	W		L
East Division
Alabama A&M xy$	6	–	3	9	–	3
Jackson State	5	–	4	6	–	5
Alcorn State	5	–	4	6	–	5
Mississippi Valley State	5	–	4	6	–	5
Alabama State	5	–	4	5	–	6
West Division
Arkansas–Pine Bluff xy	7	–	2	8	–	4
Southern	4	–	5	5	–	6
Grambling State	3	–	6	3	–	8
Texas Southern	3	–	6	3	–	8
Prairie View A&M	2	–	7	3	–	7
Championship: Alabama A&M 22, Arkansas–Pine Bluff 13
$ – Conference champion; x – Division champion/co-champions; y – Championship game participant

The 2006 Alabama State Hornets football team represented Alabama State University as a member of the Southwestern Athletic Conference (SWAC) during the 2006 NCAA Division I FCS football season. Led by fourth-year head coach Charles Coe, the Hornets compiled an overall record of 5–6, with a mark of 5–4 in conference play, and finished tied for second in the SWAC East Division.

== Schedule ==
Date	Opponent	Site	Result	Attendance	Source
September 2	at Troy*	Movie Gallery Stadium; Troy, AL	L 0–38	26,265	
September 9	Texas Southern	Cramton Bowl; Montgomery, AL	L 9–10	20,000	
September 16	Arkansas–Pine Bluff	Cramton Bowl; Montgomery, AL	W 31–13		
September 23	at Alcorn State	Jack Spinks Stadium; Lorman, MS	W 33–28		
September 30	at Southern	A. W. Mumford Stadium; Baton Rouge, LA	L 20–38		
October 7	vs. Jackson State	Ladd–Peebles Stadium; Mobile, AL (Gulf Coast Classic)	L 13–19		
October 14	at Prairie View A&M	Edward L. Blackshear Field; Prairie View, TX	W 10–7	3,281	
October 28	vs. Alabama A&M	Legion Field; Birmingham, AL (Magic City Classic)	L 13–21	66,233	
November 4	at Grambling State	Eddie G. Robinson Memorial Stadium; Grambling, LA	W 35–16		
November 11	Mississippi Valley State	Cramton Bowl; Montgomery, AL	W 25–20		
November 23	Tuskegee*	Cramton Bowl; Montgomery, AL (Turkey Day Classic)	L 10–17		
*Non-conference game
