= Carolinas Sports Entertainment Television =

Defunct regional sports network

- Country: United States
- Broadcast area: North Carolina; South Carolina

Programming
- Language: American English

Ownership
- Owner: Robert L. Johnson; Time Warner Cable

History
- Launched: October 2004
- Closed: June 2005

Carolinas Sports Entertainment Television, or C-SET, was a regional sports network in the United States that was in operation from October 2004 until June 2005. It was the primary television vehicle of the Charlotte Bobcats of the National Basketball Association during that team's first season in the league.

== History ==
C-SET was a joint venture between Bobcats owner Robert L. Johnson, the executive who founded Black Entertainment Television and used the money to become the first majority African-American owner in NBA history, and Time Warner Cable, the largest cable provider in North Carolina. It was supposed to cover both North Carolina and South Carolina. An aspect that set C-SET apart from similar team-owned channels is that Time Warner Cable did not put the channel on analog cable, instead using it as an attraction to get customers for their digital cable services. Comporium Cable, the largest cable provider on the South Carolina side of the Charlotte market, simulcast C-SET's broadcasts on its local news channel, CN2. A package of 15 Bobcats games produced by C-SET aired on WJZY.

=== Other programming ===
In addition to the Bobcats, C-SET aired college sports programs, mostly from the Big South Conference and Central Intercollegiate Athletic Association, outdoors programming (hunting and fishing), auto racing, and action sports. C-SET also planned a nightly sportscast.

=== Closure and aftermath ===
C-SET lasted only one NBA season and folded on the day of the 2005 NBA draft. The lack of analog cable carriage, as well as the Bobcats' poor attendance, was seen as a primary reason. Additionally, despite being owned by North Carolina's largest cable provider, few other providers picked up C-SET. Time Warner Cable blocked satellite television providers from carrying the channel. As a result, cable customers without a digital package, as well as western North Carolina and most of South Carolina, were left to rely on radio coverage.

In 2005, the Bobcats moved their local cable broadcasts to News 14 Carolina in another complex and limiting deal which cut out viewers who did not have Time Warner or Comporium as a cable provider. In 2006–07, the team added over-the-air broadcasts on WMYT after one season on WJZY. In April 2008, Time Warner Cable allowed the Bobcats to exit the News 14 deal and sign a more accessible broadcasting agreement with SportSouth/FSN South in exchange for Time Warner Cable acquiring the naming rights for the Charlotte Bobcats Arena, which was later renamed as Time Warner Cable Arena.

The Carolinas would not have a dedicated regional sports network focused on the region until 2008, when Fox Sports South created Fox Sports Carolinas as a regional subfeed.
