= Alexander Durley Sports Complex =

Multi-purpose stadium in Houston, Texas

Coordinates: 29°43′16″N 95°21′44″W

- Interactive map of Alexander Durley Sports Complex
- Location: Houston, TX
- Capacity: 5,500

Construction
- Opened: 1971; 55 years ago

Tenant
- Texas Southern Tigers

Alexander Durley Sports Complex is a 5,500-seat multi-purpose stadium in Houston, Texas. It was home to the Texas Southern Tigers football team through the 2011 season. The facility is named after former Tiger head coach, Alexander Durley.

In 2012, the Tigers moved into the new BBVA Compass Stadium, a soccer-specific stadium that is also home to the Houston Dynamo of Major League Soccer.

The Alexander Durley Sports Complex is currently home to the Texas Southern University soccer team.
