= 2004 Jacksonville Dolphins football team =

American college football team

2004 Jacksonville Dolphins football

PFL South Division co-champion
- Conference: Pioneer Football League
- South Division
- Record: 3–7 (2–1 PFL)
- Head coach: Steve Gilbert (7th season)
- Home stadium: D. B. Milne Field

2004 Pioneer Football League standings
	Conf.			Overall
Team	W		L	W		L
North Division
Drake xy$	4	–	0	10	–	2
San Diego	3	–	1	7	–	4
Dayton	2	–	2	7	–	3
Valparaiso	1	–	3	5	–	6
Butler	0	–	4	1	–	10
South Division
Morehead State xy	2	–	1	6	–	6
Jacksonville x	2	–	1	3	–	7
Davidson	1	–	2	2	–	7
Austin Peay	1	–	2	2	–	9
Championship: Drake 20, Morehead State 17
$ – Conference champion; x – Division champion/co-champions; y – Championship game participant

The 2004 Jacksonville Dolphins football team represented Jacksonville University as a member of the South Division of the Pioneer Football League (PFL) during the 2004 NCAA Division I-AA football season. Led by seventh-year head coach Steve Gilbert, the Dolphins compiled an overall record of 3–7 with a mark of 2–1 conference play, and tied as the PFL's South Division champions. Jacksonville played home games at D. B. Milne Field in Jacksonville, Florida.

== Schedule ==
Date	Time	Opponent	Site	Result	Attendance
September 11		at Wingate*	Irwin Belk Stadium; Wingate, NC	L 9–42	2,211
September 18	12:30 p.m.	Charleston Southern*	D. B. Milne Field; Jacksonville, FL	L 3–38	2,809
September 25		at Valparaiso*	Brown Field; Valparaiso, IN	L 38–54	905
October 2	1:00 p.m.	Drake*	D. B. Milne Field; Jacksonville, FL	L 7–20	1,633
October 9	1:00 p.m.	at Davidson	Richardson Stadium; Davidson, NC	W 29–26	827
October 16		Austin Peay	D. B. Milne Field; Jacksonville, FL	W 31–14	2,408
October 23		at Morehead State	Jayne Stadium; Morehead, KY	L 14–28	8,309
October 30		Webber International (FL)*	D. B. Milne Field; Jacksonville, FL	W 31–24	1,019
November 6	1:30 p.m.	Southeastern Louisiana*	D. B. Milne Field; Jacksonville, FL	L 3–51	2,162
November 13	12:30 p.m.	at No. 24 Coastal Carolina*	Brooks Stadium; Conway, SC	L 23–48	4,752
*Non-conference game; Rankings from The Sports Network Poll released prior to the game; All times are in Eastern time
