= 2004 Drake Bulldogs football team =

American college football season

2004 Drake Bulldogs football

PFL champion PFL North Division champion

PFL Championship Game, W 20–17 at Morehead State
- Conference: Pioneer Football League
- North Division
- Record: 10–2 (4–0 PFL)
- Head coach: Rob Ash (12th season)
- Home stadium: Drake Stadium

2004 Pioneer Football League standings
	Conf.			Overall
Team	W		L	W		L
North Division
Drake xy$	4	–	0	10	–	2
San Diego	3	–	1	7	–	4
Dayton	2	–	2	7	–	3
Valparaiso	1	–	3	5	–	6
Butler	0	–	4	1	–	10
South Division
Morehead State xy	2	–	1	6	–	6
Jacksonville x	2	–	1	3	–	7
Davidson	1	–	2	2	–	7
Austin Peay	1	–	2	2	–	9
Championship: Drake 20, Morehead State 17
$ – Conference champion; x – Division champion/co-champions; y – Championship game participant

The 2004 Drake Bulldogs football team represented Drake University as a member of the North Division of the Pioneer Football League (PFL) during the 2004 NCAA Division I-AA football season. Led by 12th-year head coach Rob Ash, the Bulldogs compiled an overall record of 10–2 with a mark of 4–0 in conference play, winning the PFL North Division title. Drake advanced to the PFL Championship Game, where the Bulldogs beat Morehead State to win the conference championship. The team played its home games at Drake Stadium in Des Moines, Iowa.

The Bulldogs were chosen as a 2004 Sports Network Cup finalist, finishing second to Monmouth in both overall votes and first place votes.

== Schedule ==
Date	Time	Opponent	Site	Result	Attendance
September 2	7:00 p.m.	at Southwest Missouri State*	Robert W. Plaster Sports Complex; Springfield, MO	L 26–31	10,304
September 11	1:00 p.m.	William Penn*	Drake Stadium; Des Moines, IA	W 38–24	8,850
September 18	1:00 p.m.	Wisconsin–Platteville*	Drake Stadium; Des Moines, IA	L 23–33	2,809
September 25	1:00 p.m.	Morehead State*	Drake Stadium; Des Moines, IA	W 42–12	3,012
October 2	12:00 p.m.	at Jacksonville*	D. B. Milne Field; Jacksonville, FL	W 20–7	1,633
October 9	1:00 p.m.	San Diego	Drake Stadium; Des Moines, IA	W 41–38	5,255
October 16	12:00 p.m.	at Butler	Butler Bowl; Indianapolis, IN	W 43–6	783
October 23	1:00 p.m.	Valparaiso	Drake Stadium; Des Moines, IA	W 37–10	3,015
October 30	12:00 p.m.	at Dayton	Welcome Stadium; Dayton, OH (rivalry)	W 13–7	5,138
November 6	1:00 p.m.	Upper Iowa*	Drake Stadium; Des Moines, IA	W 45–27	2,886
November 13	1:00 p.m.	Waldorf	Drake Stadium; Des Moines, IA	W 39–7	2,809
November 20	12:00 p.m.	at Morehead State*	Jayne Stadium; Morehead, KY (PFL Championship Game)	W 20–17	1,798
*Non-conference game; All times are in Central time
