= 2004 Davidson Wildcats football team =

American college football season

2004 Davidson Wildcats football
- Conference: Pioneer Football League
- Record: 2–7 (2–4 PFL)
- Head coach: Mike Toop (4th season)
- Home stadium: Richardson Stadium

2004 Pioneer Football League standings
	Conf.			Overall
Team	W		L	W		L
North Division
Drake xy$	4	–	0	10	–	2
San Diego	3	–	1	7	–	4
Dayton	2	–	2	7	–	3
Valparaiso	1	–	3	5	–	6
Butler	0	–	4	1	–	10
South Division
Morehead State xy	2	–	1	6	–	6
Jacksonville x	2	–	1	3	–	7
Davidson	1	–	2	2	–	7
Austin Peay	1	–	2	2	–	9
Championship: Drake 20, Morehead State 17
$ – Conference champion; x – Division champion/co-champions; y – Championship game participant

The 2004 Davidson Wildcats football team represented Davidson College as a member of the Pioneer Football League (PFL) during the 2004 NCAA Division I-AA football season. Led by fourth-year head coach Mike Toop, the Wildcats compiled an overall record of 2–7 with a mark of 2–4 in conference play, and would place third in the PFL South Division. The team played home games at Richardson Stadium in Davidson, North Carolina.

== Schedule ==
Date	Time	Opponent	Site	Result	Attendance	Source
September 11	7:00 p.m.	at Coastal Carolina*	Brooks Stadium; Conway, SC	L 24–31	6,943	
September 18	7:00 p.m.	at Lenoir–Rhyne*	Moretz Stadium; Hickory, NC	L 3–26	5,896	
September 25	1:00 p.m.	at Butler	Richardson Stadium; Davidson, NC	W 21–14	3,812	
October 2	1:00 p.m.	at Dayton	Welcome Stadium; Dayton, OH	L 27-45	2,538	
October 9	1:00 p.m.	Jacksonville	Richardson Stadium; Davidson, NC	L 26–29	827	
October 16	1:00 p.m.	Morehead State	Richardson Stadium; Davidson, NC	W 14–10	1,221	
October 23	10:00 p.m.	at San Diego	Torero Stadium; San Diego, CA	L 0–56	3,287	
November 6	2:00 p.m.	at Austin Peay	Fortera Stadium; Clarksville, TN	L 17–20 ^{2OT}	4,122	
November 13	1:00 p.m.	Georgetown*	Richardson Stadium; Davidson, NC	L 0–23	2,482	
*Non-conference game; All times are in Eastern time
