= Jim Harbaugh =

American football coach (born 1963)

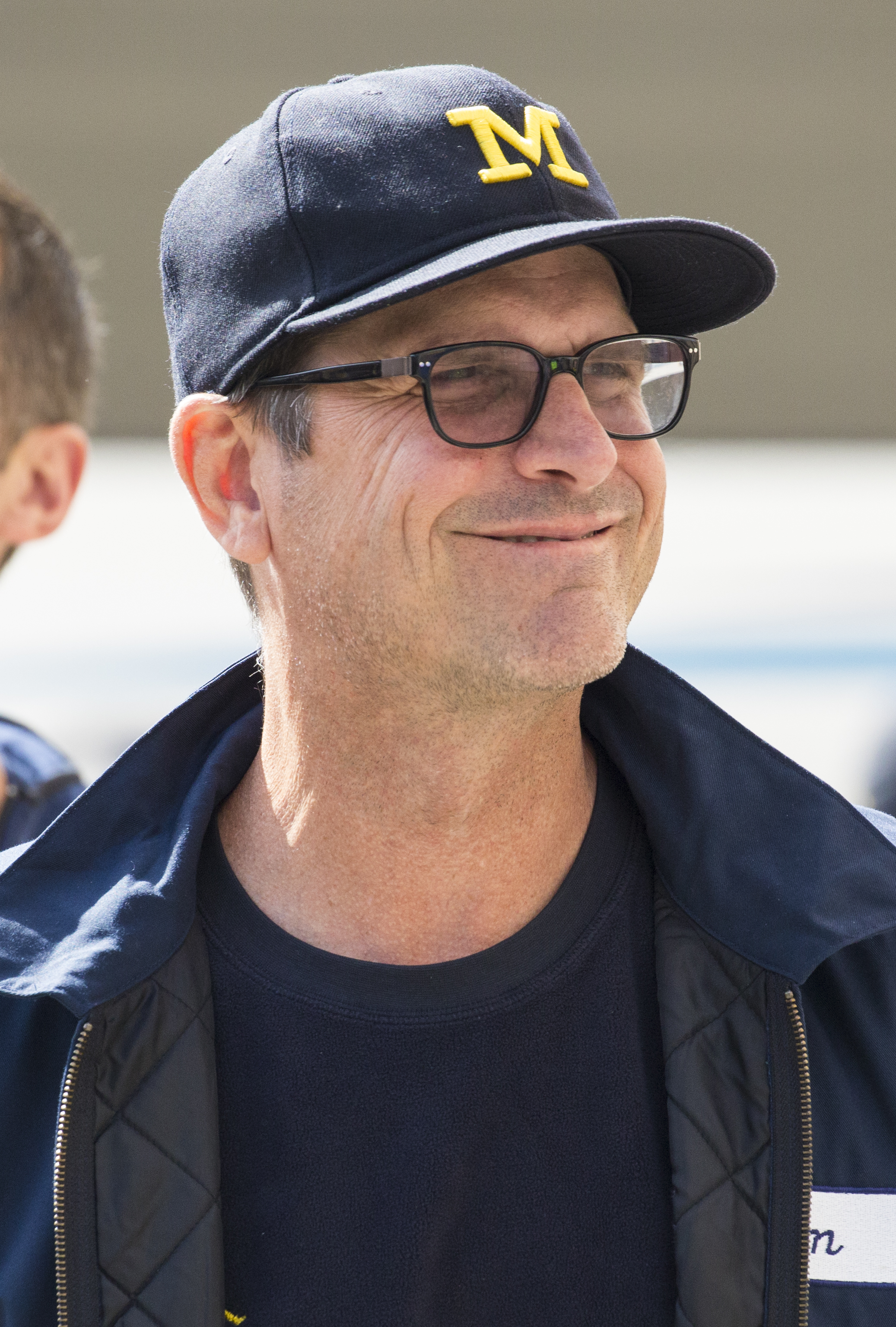
- Harbaugh with the Michigan Wolverines in 2018

Los Angeles Chargers
- Title: Head coach

Personal information
- Born: December 23, 1963 (age 62); Toledo, Ohio, U.S.
- Listed height: 6 ft 3 in (1.91 m)
- Listed weight: 215 lb (98 kg)

Career information
- Position: Quarterback (No. 14, 4, 12)
- High school: Palo Alto (Palo Alto, California)
- College: Michigan (1982–1986)
- NFL draft: 1987: 1st round, 26th overall pick

Career history

Playing
- Chicago Bears (1987–1993); Indianapolis Colts (1994–1997); Baltimore Ravens (1998); San Diego Chargers (1999–2000); Detroit Lions (2001)*; Carolina Panthers (2001)
- * Offseason or practice squad member only

Coaching
- Western Kentucky (1994–2001) Offensive consultant; Oakland Raiders (2002–2003) Quarterbacks coach; San Diego (2004–2006) Head coach; Stanford (2007–2010) Head coach; San Francisco 49ers (2011–2014) Head coach; Michigan (2015–2023) Head coach; Los Angeles Chargers (2024–present) Head coach

Awards and highlights
- Playing: Indianapolis Colts Ring of Honor (2005); George Halas Award (1997); NFL Comeback Player of the Year (1995); Pro Bowl (1995); NFL passer rating leader (1995); Chic Harley Award (1986); Second-team All-American (1986); NCAA passer rating leader (1985); Big Ten Most Valuable Player (1986); Big Ten Player of the Year (1986); First-team All-Big Ten (1986); Coaching: National champion (2023); 3× Big Ten champion (2021–2023); 4× Big Ten East Division champion (2018, 2021–2023); Big Ten Coach of the Year (2022); AP College Football Coach of the Year (2021); NFL Coach of the Year (2011); Woody Hayes Trophy (2010); 2× PFL champion (2005, 2006); 2× Consensus Mid-Major champion (2005, 2006); PFL North Division champion (2005)

Career NFL statistics
- Passing attempts: 3,918
- Passing completions: 2,305
- Completion percentage: 58.8%
- TD–INT: 129–117
- Passing yards: 26,288
- Passer rating: 77.6
- Rushing yards: 2,787
- Rushing touchdowns: 18
- Stats at Pro Football Reference

Head coaching record
- Regular season: NFL: 66–35–1 (.652); NCAA: 139–45 (.755)
- Postseason: NFL: 5–5 (.500); NCAA: 5–7 (.417)
- Career: NFL: 71–40–1 (.638); NCAA: 144–52 (.735)
- Coaching profile at Pro Football Reference

James Joseph Harbaugh (/ˈhɑːrbɔː/ HAR-baw; born December 23, 1963) is an American professional football coach and former quarterback who is the head coach for the Los Angeles Chargers of the National Football League (NFL). He previously served as the head coach at the University of Michigan from 2015 to 2023, the San Francisco 49ers from 2011 to 2014, Stanford University from 2007 to 2010, and the University of San Diego from 2004 to 2006. Harbaugh played college football at Michigan from 1983 to 1986 and in the National Football League (NFL) for 14 seasons from 1987 to 2000, with his longest tenure (1987–1993) as a player with the Chicago Bears.

Harbaugh was born in Toledo, Ohio. His father, Jack Harbaugh, was a football coach, and the family lived in Ohio, Kentucky, Iowa, Michigan, and California. He attended high school in Ann Arbor, Michigan, and Palo Alto, California, when his father was an assistant coach at Michigan and Stanford, respectively. After graduation from high school in Palo Alto in 1982, Harbaugh returned to Ann Arbor and enrolled at the University of Michigan and played quarterback for the Wolverines, starting for three seasons. As a fifth-year senior in 1986, he led Michigan to the 1987 Rose Bowl and was a Heisman Trophy finalist, finishing third.

The Chicago Bears selected Harbaugh in the first round of the 1987 NFL draft. He played 14 years as a quarterback in the NFL, with Chicago from 1987 to 1993, the Indianapolis Colts from 1994 to 1997, the Baltimore Ravens in 1998, and the San Diego Chargers in 1999 to 2000. He first became a regular starting quarterback in 1990 with Chicago. In 1995 with Indianapolis, he led the Colts to the AFC Championship Game, was selected to the Pro Bowl and was honored as NFL Comeback Player of the Year.

From 1994 to 2001, while still playing in the NFL, Harbaugh was an unpaid assistant coach at Western Kentucky University, where his father Jack was head coach. In 2002, he returned to the NFL as the quarterbacks coach for the Oakland Raiders. Harbaugh returned to the college ranks in 2004 as the head coach at the University of San Diego. After leading San Diego to consecutive Pioneer League championships in 2005 and 2006, he moved to Stanford in 2007, where he led the Cardinal to two bowl berths in four seasons, including a win in the 2011 Orange Bowl. Immediately afterward, Harbaugh signed a five-year deal as head coach of the NFL's San Francisco 49ers, where he led the team to the NFC Championship game in each of his first three seasons after the franchise missed the playoffs for eight consecutive seasons beforehand. He and his older brother, former Baltimore Ravens and current New York Giants head coach John Harbaugh, became the first pair of brothers to serve as head coaches in NFL history. Their teams played in a Thanksgiving Classic game in 2011 and in Super Bowl XLVII at the end of the 2012 season.

Harbaugh accepted the job as head football coach for the University of Michigan Wolverines in 2015. Harbaugh led the team to three consecutive Big Ten Conference titles, including berths in the College Football Playoff in the 2021 and 2022 season, eventually winning a national championship in 2023: the school's first since 1997, and the first undisputed national championship since 1948.

On January 24, 2024, Harbaugh left Michigan to return to the NFL, signing a five-year contract to become the head coach of the Los Angeles Chargers, leading them to back-to-back playoff appearances in his first two years as head coach.

== Early life and education ==
Born in Toledo, Ohio, on December 23, 1963, Harbaugh is the son of Jacqueline M. "Jackie" (née Cipiti) and Jack Harbaugh. His mother is of half-Sicilian and half-Polish ancestry and his father is of Irish and German ancestry. Both Jim and his brother John were born in Toledo, while his father was an assistant football coach at nearby Perrysburg High School in Perrysburg.

During Harbaugh's childhood, the family moved frequently, as his father held assistant coaching positions at Morehead State (1967), Bowling Green (1967–1970), Iowa (1971–1973), Michigan (1973–1979), Stanford (1980–1981), and Western Michigan (1982–1986). Harbaugh played for the junior league Ann Arbor Packers and then for Tappan Junior High, (now Tappan Middle School) before moving on to Pioneer High School. When his father became defensive coordinator at Stanford, he transferred to Palo Alto High School, graduating in 1982.

Harbaugh received a Bachelor of Arts with a major in communications from the University of Michigan in 1986.

== College playing career ==
=== 1982 and 1983 seasons ===
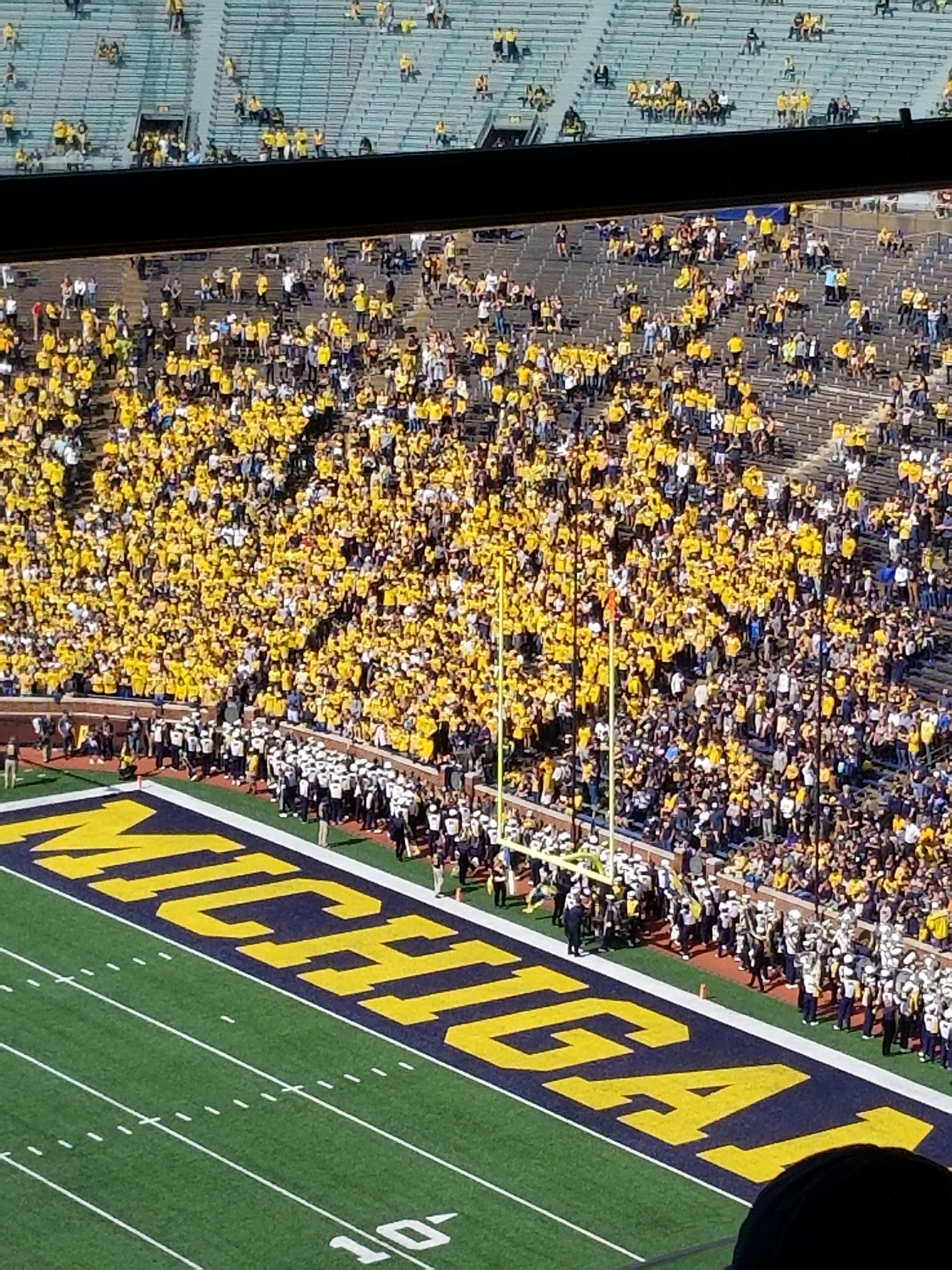
Harbaugh played quarterback for the Michigan Wolverines (pictured)

In February 1982, Harbaugh committed to play football for Bo Schembechler's Michigan Wolverines football team. He came to Michigan with a "high school reputation as a slick California passer."

As a freshman in 1982 Harbaugh, age 18, and junior Dave Hall were backups to quarterback Steve Smith who had broken Michigan's single season record with 2,335 yards of total offense in 1981. In the 1982 season, Smith started all 12 games, and Hall handled the limited backup role. Even as Smith struggled, coach Schembechler expressed a reluctance to play Harbaugh, saying, "To suddenly pull some freshman out of the bag, I don't think you can do that, in today's football." Harbaugh did not see any game action in 1982, registered no statistics, and retained four years of eligibility under the NCAA's redshirt rule.

Harbaugh performed well in the annual spring game in April 1983, completing 10 of 15 passes for 116 yards. After the game, coach Schembechler noted, "Harbaugh is a fresh talent who'll be all right, but he has a lot to learn." While Harbaugh was touted as the team's "pass-oriented quarterback of the future," he spent the 1983 season as Michigan's No. 3 quarterback behind Steve Smith and Dave Hall. Smith started 11 games, and Hall started one game, while Harbaugh completed two of five passes for 40 yards in limited action. Harbaugh completed his first pass for Michigan on November 5, 1983, in a 42–10 victory over Purdue.

=== 1984 season ===
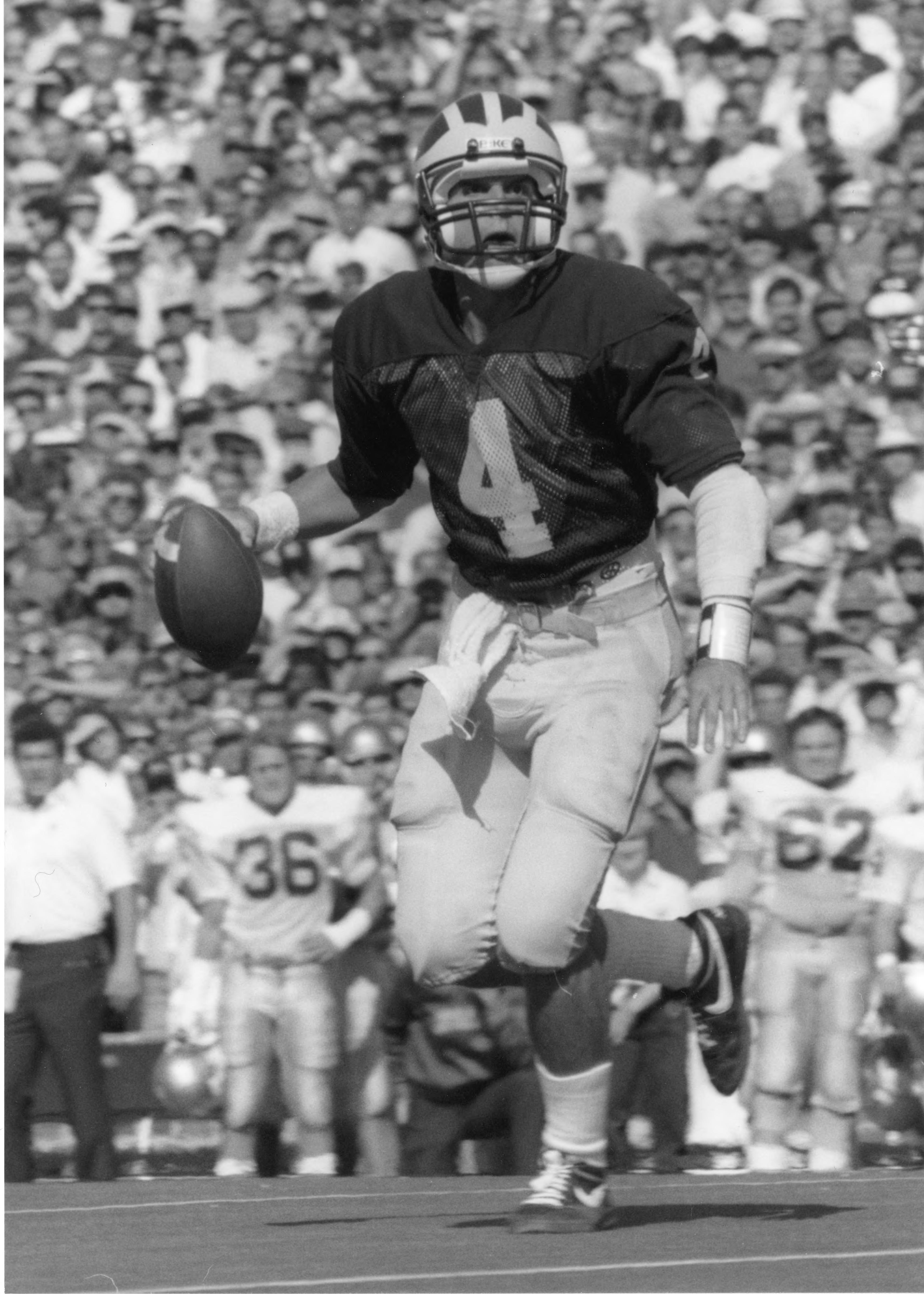
Harbaugh during the 1984 season

In the spring of 1984, Harbaugh was in a three-way competition for Michigan's starting quarterback job. Three-year starter Steve Smith had graduated, and his backup, Dave Hall, was lost to a knee injury. The 1983 competition pitted Harbaugh against sophomores Chris Zurbrugg and Russ Rein. In April 1984, Schembechler said, "Harbaugh is coming along pretty well. He's having a pretty good spring. Zurbrugg has emerged as a good prospect. There's kind of a battle in there." In the 1984 spring game, Harbaugh impressed observers as he completed 17 of 26 passes for 161 yards and an interception. Schembechler said after the game, "We've been happy with Jim all spring. He's shown a lot of maturity." After spring practice, Schembechler announced his depth chart with Harbaugh as his No. 1 quarterback.

In his first collegiate start, Harbaugh led the Wolverines to a 22–14 upset victory over a Miami Hurricanes team that was led by Bernie Kosar, had won the 1983 national championship, and was ranked No. 1 in both the AP and UPI polls. Harbaugh completed 11 of 21 passes for 162 yards and two interceptions. The Detroit Free Press praised Harbaugh for "pinpoint passing" that "kept Miami's defense on the run."

In his second start, the Wolverines (ranked No. 3) lost to a Washington team that finished the season ranked No. 2 in both the AP and UPI polls. Harbaugh threw a career-high 37 passes in the game, completing 17 passes for 183 yards, three interceptions, and his first collegiate touchdown pass, to Vince Bean.

After the loss to Washington, Harbaugh led Michigan to victories over Wisconsin (20–14) and Indiana (14–6). Harbaugh completed 25 of 39 passes for 272 yards in those games. On October 6, 1984, a 19–7 loss to Michigan State in the fifth game of the season, Harbaugh sustained a badly broken left arm in the third quarter when he dove for a loose ball and collided with Spartan linebacker Thomas Tyree. Harbaugh had to be carried from the field on a stretcher and missed the remainder of the season. Harbaugh completed 60 of 111 passes for 718 yards, three touchdowns and five interceptions during his shortened 1984 season.

=== 1985 season ===
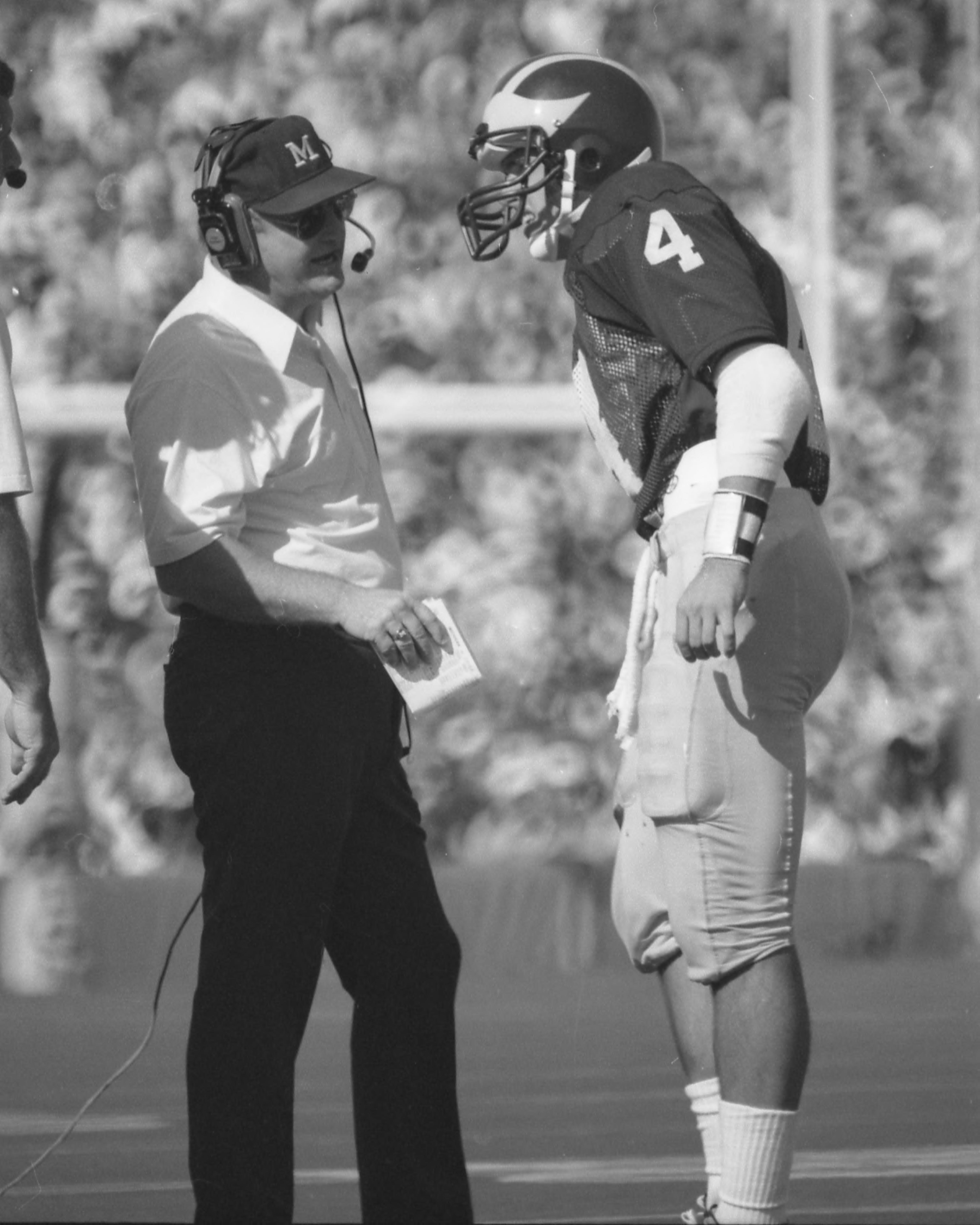
Harbaugh (right) with Michigan coach, Bo Schembechler (left) during the Notre Dame opening game

By April 1985, Harbaugh's arm had healed, and he completed 10 of 16 passes for 146 yards in the annual spring game. Harbaugh was the starting quarterback in all 12 games for the 1985 Michigan Wolverines football team that compiled a 10–1–1 record, outscored opponents 342–98, defeated Nebraska in the 1986 Fiesta Bowl, and finished the season ranked No. 2 in the final AP and UPI polls. He led the nation with a passer rating of 163.7.

On October 26, 1985, Harbaugh set a school record with 283 passing yards in a 42–15 victory over Indiana. After the game, Harbaugh was asked for his reaction to setting the school's passing record and responded, "Records are nice, but everything we do here is team oriented. Everyone's telling me about the record, but they should tell it to Paul Jokisch and Eric Kattus and John Kolesar. They caught the passes."

On November 16, 1985, in a 48–7 victory over Minnesota, Harbaugh completed 13 of 18 passes for 243 yards and three touchdowns. After the game, Harbaugh praised the offensive line, noting, "I've never had more time to throw in my life—junior high, high school." Harbaugh's 13 completions against Minnesota gave him 123 for the season, breaking the school record of 118 set by Steve Smith in 1982.

On November 23, 1985, Harbaugh led Michigan to a 27–17 victory over Ohio State. In the fourth quarter, Harbaugh completed a 77-yard touchdown pass to wide receiver John Kolesar, giving Michigan a 10-point lead with nine minutes remaining. Coach Schembechler said after the game that the 77-yard touchdown was "a play that took the starch right out of their sails." Columnist Mitch Albom wrote after the game that Harbaugh's pass to Kolesar was an image that would last: "The image that repeats will be that of Jim Harbaugh dropping back in the fourth quarter and uncorking a soaring spiral that rose high and long as flanker John Kolesar ran underneath it, his steps seemingly in sync with the revolutions of the ball, so [that] when it fell, it fell right into his arms, almost gently." Harbaugh completed 16 of 19 passes for 230 yards and three touchdowns.

In the final three games of the 1985 regular season, Harbaugh completed 41 of 50 passes for 706 yards, nine touchdowns, and no interceptions. For the season as a whole, he completed 145 of 227 passes for 1,976 yards, 18 touchdowns and six interceptions. He also led the nation with a 163.7 passing efficiency rating in 1985.

=== 1986 season ===
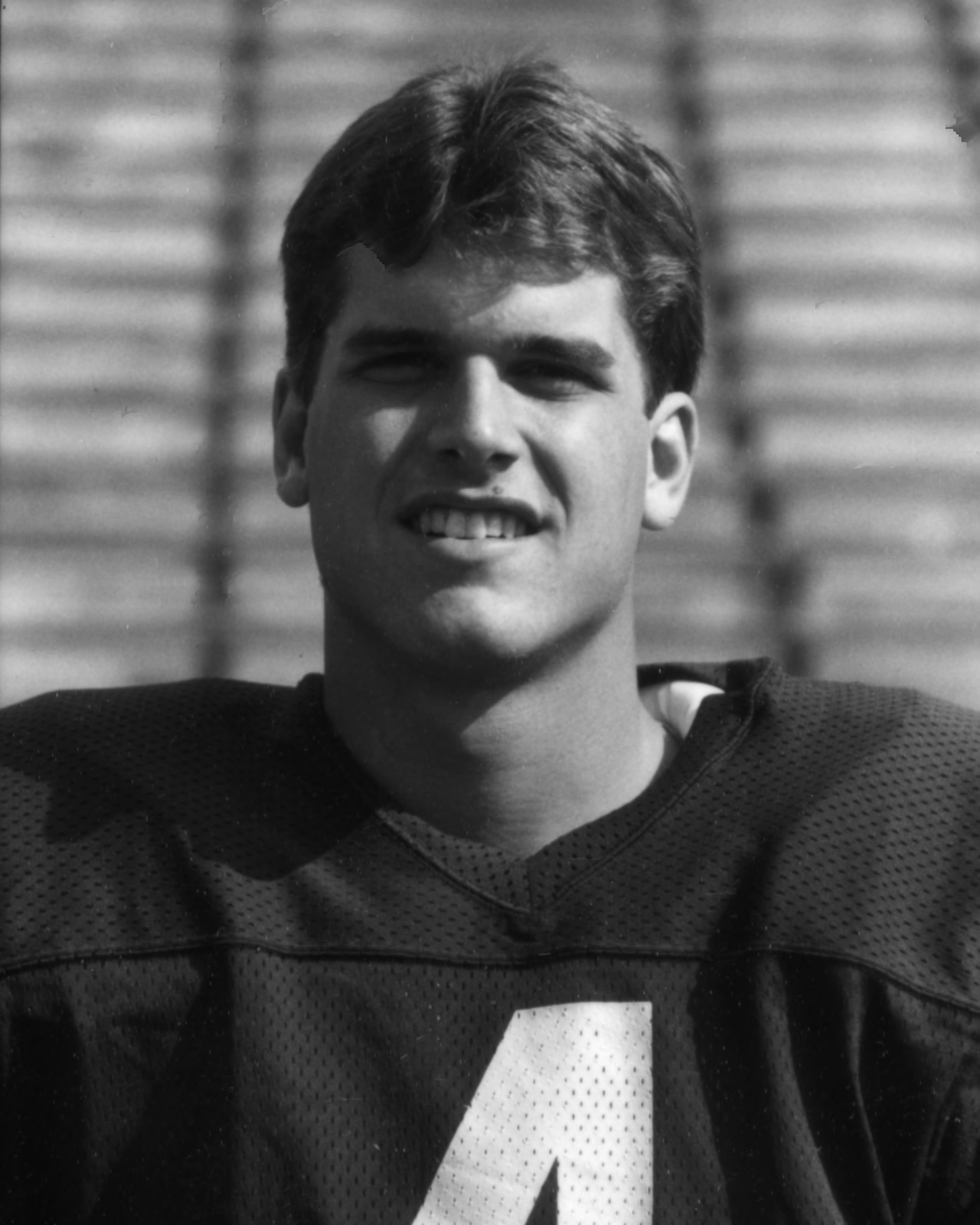
Harbaugh in 1986 at Michigan

In 1986, his final season at Michigan, Harbaugh started all 13 games at quarterback for the 1986 Michigan Wolverines football team that compiled an 11–2 record, lost to Arizona State in the 1987 Rose Bowl, and finished the season ranked No. 8 in the final AP Poll and No. 7 in the final UPI Poll.

In the first game of the season, Harbaugh led Michigan to a 24–23 victory over Notre Dame. Harbaugh completed 15 of 23 passes for 239 yards and a touchdown.

In the fourth game of the season, he broke his own Michigan school record with 310 passing yards in Schembechler's 200th career victory, a 34–17 victory over Wisconsin.

Harbaugh caused controversy when he guaranteed a victory over Ohio State in 1986. Harbaugh's guarantee proved valid as the Wolverines defeated the Buckeyes, 26–24. Harbaugh completed 19 of 29 passes with two interceptions.

For the season, Harbaugh completed 180 of 277 passes for 2,729 yards, 10 touchdowns, and 11 interceptions. His 2,729 passing yards set a Michigan season record that stood until 2002. He also finished second in the country in passing efficiency behind Heisman Trophy winner Vinny Testaverde. Harbaugh won numerous honors in 1986 including the following:

- He won the Chicago Tribune Silver Football trophy as the most valuable player in the Big Ten Conference.
- He finished third in the Heisman Trophy voting with 458 points and 25 first-place ballots, trailing Testaverde (2,213 points, 678 first-place ballots) and Temple running back Paul Palmer (672 points, 28 first-place ballots).
- He was selected by the Associated Press (AP) and United Press International (UPI) as the first-team quarterback on the 1986 All-Big Ten Conference football team.
- He was selected by the AP and UPI as the second-team quarterback behind Testaverde on the 1986 College Football All-America Team.
- He was named to the Big Ten's All-Academic team.
- He was named Big Ten Player of the Year

Harbaugh finished his college career as Michigan's all-time record holder for passing yards with 5,449 yards. He also tallied 620 passing attempts (second in Michigan history at the time), 387 completions, a 62.4% completion percentage, 31 touchdown passes (third in Michigan history at the time), and 22 interceptions. He held the career NCAA Division I-A passing efficiency record (149.6) for 12 years. Harbaugh earned a B.A. in communications from Michigan's College of Literature, Science, and the Arts in 1986.

== Professional playing career ==
Pre-draft measurables
Height	Weight	Arm length	Hand span
6 ft 2 1/4 in (1.89 m)	203 lb (92 kg)	31 1/4 in (0.79 m)	9 3/4 in (0.25 m)

=== Chicago Bears ===
The Chicago Bears selected Harbaugh in the first round (26th overall) of the 1987 NFL draft. During the 1987 season, playing under head coach Mike Ditka, Harbaugh completed only one of 15 passes in an August 27 exhibition game against the St. Louis Cardinals. During the regular season, he played in a reserve capacity in six games. On November 22, in a 30–10 win over the Detroit Lions, Harbaugh took only one snap and was sacked for 15 yards. On December 14, in a 41–0 loss to the San Francisco 49ers, Harbaugh threw his first NFL passes, completing 8 of 11 (72.7%) for 62 yards, was sacked 3 times for 30 yards, and rushed 15 yards on three carries.

Harbaugh played 10 games in 1988 and completed 47 of 97 passes (48.5%) for 514 yards and two interceptions. He rushed 110 yards on 19 carries. Harbaugh started his first game on Week 14 (December 5), a 23–3 loss to the Los Angeles Rams in which he completed 11 of 30 passes for 108 yards and two interceptions, rushed 32 yards on six carries, and was sacked twice for nine yards. The following game on December 12, Harbaugh earned his first win as an NFL starter with a 13–12 victory over the Detroit Lions. Harbaugh completed 18 of 26 passes for 174 yards and rushed 36 yards in seven carries.

Harbaugh saw more playing time in 1989 after Jim McMahon left the team and started five games for Chicago while Mike Tomczak started 11 in a 6–10 season for Chicago. 1989 was his first season with over 1,000 passing yards, completing 111 of 178 passes in 12 games for 1,204 yards for five touchdowns and nine interceptions and was sacked 18 times for 106 yards. His 62.4% completion rate earned him the team record for single-season completion percentage.

In 1990, Harbaugh played and started in the first 14 games of the season. Chicago improved to 11–5 and won the NFC Central division, and Harbaugh passed for 2,178 yards with 180 of 312 (57.7%) passes completed for 10 touchdowns and 6 interceptions. He was sacked 31 times for 206 yards and rushed 321 yards in 51 carries. Due to a shoulder injury, Harbaugh sat out the last two games of the year as well as the playoffs.

Harbaugh passed for a career-high 3,121 yards with Chicago in 1991 and became the first Chicago quarterback since Vince Evans to start all 16 regular season games. He completed 275 of 478 (57.5%) passes for 15 touchdowns and 16 interceptions, was sacked 24 times (including a franchise-record 9 times on October 25 against the Minnesota Vikings) for a loss of 163 yards, and rushed 338 yards on 70 carries. Chicago finished the season 11–5 like the year before, but in second place in the NFC Central. On December 29, 1991, he made his postseason debut in the NFC Wild Card Round, a 17–13 loss to the Dallas Cowboys. The Dallas defense overwhelmed him throughout the game, sacking him three times; and in the final drive of the game that started from Chicago's 4-yard line with 1:50 left, he threw an interception to Bill Bates on the fourth play from scrimmage. He went 22-of-44 for 218 yards.

Chicago regressed to a 5–11 record in 1992, and the team fired coach Ditka afterwards. Harbaugh played all 16 games but started only 13 and had a 5–8 record as starter. He completed 202 of 358 (56.4%) passes for 2,486 yards, 13 touchdowns, and 12 interceptions, was sacked 31 times for 167 yards, and rushed 272 yards over 47 carries, including one rushing touchdown.

In 1993, Chicago went 7–9. Harbaugh played in and started 15 games and completed 200 of 325 (61.5%) passes for 2,002 yards, seven touchdowns, and 11 interceptions. He was sacked 43 times for 210 yards and rushed 277 yards over 60 carries. Harbaugh ended his tenure with Chicago with a 35–30 (.538) record.

=== Indianapolis Colts ===
==== 1994 season ====
On April 7, 1994, Harbaugh signed with the Indianapolis Colts. He played and started in just nine games in the 1994 Colts season, completing 125 of 202 (61.9%) passes for 1,440 yards, nine touchdowns, and six interceptions. Harbaugh took 17 sacks for 72 yards and rushed 223 yards over 39 carries. For the first eight games, Harbaugh was starter, and coach Ted Marchibroda re-instated Harbaugh as starter for Week 15 (December 18) after Indianapolis struggled on offense under quarterback Don Majkowski.

==== 1995 season ====
In 1995, Harbaugh achieved career highs in completion percentage (63.7%), passer rating (100.7), and touchdown passes (17) and led Indianapolis to the AFC Championship Game. Harbaugh played 15 games in the regular season and started 12, with a 7–5 record as starter for a 9–7 team. Harbaugh completed 200 of 314 passes for 2,575 yards and just 5 interceptions with his 17 touchdowns and was sacked 36 times for 219 yards. In 52 carries, Harbaugh rushed for 235 yards and two touchdowns. He strained his right knee after being sacked six times and left the Week 14 (December 3) game against the Carolina Panthers in the third quarter.

Indianapolis lost to the defending AFC champion San Diego Chargers in Week 16 (December 17) 27–24, with John Carney kicking the winning field goal with three seconds left after Harbaugh's drive with three straight passes had led to Cary Blanchard's field goal that tied the game at 24 with 48 seconds left.

In the regular season finale on December 23, Harbaugh's 32nd birthday, Indianapolis clinched a playoff berth with a 10–7 win over the New England Patriots. Completing 20 of 30 passes, he threw for 225 yards and a touchdown.

On December 31, 1995, in the AFC Wild Card Round against San Diego, Harbaugh scored on a 3-yard quarterback sneak in the fourth quarter after a 32-yard interception return by Jason Belser and Indianapolis won 35–20. Indianapolis won the Divisional Round game on January 7, 1996, over the Kansas City Chiefs 10–7, despite only 112 passing yards (with 12 of 27 passes completed, one touchdown, and one interception) from Harbaugh. In the AFC Championship Game on January 14, Harbaugh completed 21 of 33 passes for 267 yards and a touchdown and rushed 29 yards on six carries. Aaron Bailey dropped Harbaugh's last-second Hail Mary pass in the endzone, and the Pittsburgh Steelers won 20–16 and went on to Super Bowl XXX, which they lost to the Dallas Cowboys. For the season, he was voted to the Pro Bowl, was named the PFWA Comeback Player of the Year and AFC Player of the Year.

==== 1996 season ====
With new coach Lindy Infante, Indianapolis again finished 9–7 and made the playoffs in 1996 with Harbaugh as signal caller. Harbaugh played and started in 14 games with a 7–7 record; he completed 232 of 405 (57.3%) passes for 2,630 yards, 13 touchdowns, and 11 interceptions, with 36 sacks for 190 yards lost and 192 rushing yards on 48 carries and a touchdown. Defending AFC Champion Pittsburgh Steelers defeated Indianapolis in the Wild Card Round 42–14 as Harbaugh completed only 37.5% of his passes (12 of 32) for 134 yards, one touchdown, and one interception.

==== 1997 season ====
Indianapolis fell to 3–13 in 1997. Despite passing for 2,060 yards, 10 touchdowns, and four interceptions in 12 games and 189-for-309 (61.2%) passing, Harbaugh had a 2–9 record as starter. Harbaugh was sacked 41 times for a career-high 256 yards lost. Harbaugh missed four games of the season after he punched former quarterback Jim Kelly in the face because Kelly had called him a "baby."

=== Baltimore Ravens ===
On February 14, 1998, the Indianapolis Colts traded Harbaugh to the Baltimore Ravens for third-round and fourth-round draft picks in the 1998 NFL draft. With that trade, Harbaugh reunited with his former Colts coach Ted Marchibroda. During the 1998 season with Baltimore, Harbaugh played in 14 games and started 12, with a 5–7 record as starter in a 6–10 season for the Ravens. Harbaugh completed 164 of 293 (56.0%) passes for 1,839 yards, just his third season with fewer than 2,000 passing yards since 1989. He had 12 touchdowns and 11 interceptions in passing, was sacked 23 times for 145 yards, and rushed 172 yards on 40 carries.

The Ravens opened a new stadium for 1998, Ravens Stadium at Camden Yards (renamed M&T Bank Stadium in 2003). Starting the game in Week 1 (September 6) and completing 4 of 7 passes for 33 yards, Harbaugh left during the second quarter after injuring a finger, and with backup Eric Zeier in for Harbaugh, Baltimore lost to the Pittsburgh Steelers 20–13. Baltimore won its next game 24–10 over the New York Jets on September 13; Harbaugh started and made 5 of 10 passes for 36 yards but again left early and was replaced by Zeier due to injury. Coach Marchibroda again split quarterbacking duties in the following game on September 20, a 24–10 loss to the Jacksonville Jaguars, with Harbaugh starting and Zeier taking over during the second quarter. With 4 of 9 passes completed for 59 yards, Harbaugh led a drive for a Matt Stover first quarter field goal.

Harbaugh then sat out two games and played as Zeier's backup for Weeks 7 (October 18) and 8 (October 25). Those two games had poor performances: Harbaugh completed none of six passes and had one 3-yard rush in the Week 6 loss to Pittsburgh. Despite only 9 of 20 passes completed and two interceptions in the Week 7 28–10 loss to the Green Bay Packers, Harbaugh made his first passing touchdown as a Raven, a 46-yard pass to Jermaine Lewis in the fourth quarter. In the next game on Week 8 (November 1), Harbaugh improved in his first full game, with 27 of 34 passes completed over 243 yards for three touchdowns and one interception and 57 rushing yards in 10 carries. In Week 9 (November 8), with Baltimore winning 13–10 over the Oakland Raiders, Harbaugh got his first win in a full game started despite passing for only 102 yards, no touchdowns, and an interception. In the final two drives of the game, Harbaugh made crucial first-down conversion passes of a 28-yard pass to Jermaine Lewis and 10- and 11-yard passes to Michael Jackson. In Week 12 (November 29), a 38–31 win over the Indianapolis Colts, Harbaugh had his first interception-free full game, with 16-for-25 passing over 198 yards for two touchdowns. It was the Colts first trip back to Baltimore after the team left it for Indianapolis. In an emotional moment, Harbaugh presented Johnny Unitas with the game ball.

Referee Ed Hochuli called a controversial unnecessary roughness penalty against Joe Bowden in Baltimore's 16–14 loss to the Tennessee Oilers for his hit on Harbaugh on a 2nd-and-24 play with Tennessee leading 14–13 after his 9-yard scramble towards the sideline, ruling that Harbaugh was in bounds when hit. On 3rd-and-15 in the next series, however, Harbaugh was sacked and Baltimore was forced to punt, so the penalty did not hurt the Oilers. Harbaugh completed 15 of 28 passes for 214 yards, two touchdowns, and one interception and rushed 22 yards over five carries. After a three-game losing streak, Harbaugh won the final game of the season (and his final game with Baltimore) on December 27, 19–10 over the Detroit Lions with 17 of 26 passes completed for 141 yards and a touchdown.

=== San Diego Chargers ===
==== 1999 season ====
Harbaugh played two years with the San Diego Chargers. Signed as the backup to Ryan Leaf, Harbaugh played most of the 1999 season after Leaf sustained a season-ending injury in training camp. Harbaugh started 12 games out of 14 played and had a 6–6 record as starter in an 8–8 season, completing 249 of 434 (57.4%) passes for 2,761 yards, 10 touchdowns, and 14 interceptions. He was sacked 37 times for a total loss of 208 yards and rushed for 126 yards over 34 carries.

In his debut with San Diego in the September 19 season opener (Week 2), Harbaugh threw two touchdowns in 15-for-27 passing for 159 yards in a 34–7 win over the Cincinnati Bengals. However, San Diego lost their next game to Harbaugh's former team, the Indianapolis Colts, 27–19. Harbaugh completed 15 of 37 passes for 188 yards. With very few seconds left and the ball on the Colts' 24, Harbaugh threw an interception to Tyrone Poole. Harbaugh started the Week 4 (October 3) game against the Kansas City Chiefs completing 6 of 9 passes for 38 yards and an interception before leaving due to a bruised right elbow; he missed the Week 5 (October 10) and Week 6 (October 17) games because of that injury and two broken ribs. Harbaugh returned in Week 7 (October 24) in a 31–3 loss to the Green Bay Packers as backup to starter Erik Kramer; both quarterbacks threw 3 interceptions each. Harbaugh next started a game on Week 9 (November 7) and completed 25 of 39 passes for 235 yards, two touchdowns, and two interceptions and rushed 14 yards in two carries in a 33–17 loss to defending champion Denver Broncos. The Chargers lost its sixth game in a row after a 4–1 start in Week 12 (November 28) to the Minnesota Vikings 35–27. Robert Griffith intercepted a Harbaugh pass at the Vikings' 1-yard line with 4:29 left, and Minnesota ran out the clock to seal the win.

A 12–9 loss to the Miami Dolphins on December 19 (Week 15) disqualified the Chargers from the postseason. Miami's defense sacked Harbaugh five times, and Rich Owens strip-sacked Harbaugh at San Diego's 20-yard line. Harbaugh finished the game with 20 of 40 passes completed for 178 yards. With 17 seconds left, Chris Penn caught Harbaugh's attempt at a game-winning touchdown pass albeit slightly outside the back of the end zone. John Carney missed a game-tying 36-yard field goal. After failing to make a passing touchdown for three games, Harbaugh made two passing touchdowns and just one interception on 23-for-36 passing over 325 yards in San Diego's 23–20 win over the Oakland Raiders on the home finale on December 26 (Week 16).

==== 2000 season ====
Following an 8–8 season in 1999, San Diego finished 1–15 in 2000 with a rotation of Ryan Leaf, Harbaugh, and Moses Moreno as starters. Playing in seven games and starting five, Harbaugh completed 123 of 202 (60.9%) passes for 1,416 yards, 8 touchdowns, and 10 interceptions, was sacked 14 times for 96 yards, and rushed 24 yards on 16 carries.

Harbaugh played his first game in Week 4 (September 24), a 20–12 loss to the Seattle Seahawks. On 8-for-14 passing, Harbaugh passed for 67 yards and an interception. He became starter in Week 5 (October 1). In the 57–31 loss to defending champion St. Louis Rams, Harbaugh was 27-for-40 for 348 yards, two touchdowns, and one interception and was sacked three times for 15 yards. Starting the Week 6 (October 8) game, a 21–7 loss the Denver Broncos, Harbaugh was 18-for-43 for 237 yards, one touchdown, and three interceptions. Two of Harbaugh's interceptions led to short Denver touchdowns, and Harbaugh threw his third interception on fourth-and-goal at Denver's 5-yard line. In Week 7 (October 15), an overtime 27–24 loss to the Buffalo Bills, Harbaugh's second interception of the game, by Henry Jones, was in overtime and paved way for Steve Christie's game-winning field goal. Following the game, coach Mike Riley said he regretted rotating between Harbaugh and Moses Moreno in the first half, as Moreno lost two fumbles, one of which Buffalo returned for a touchdown.

San Diego had an ESPN Sunday Night Football game in Week 9 (October 29) following a bye week, lost to the Oakland Raiders 15–13, and fell to 0–8. San Diego took a 13–12 lead with 5:47 left after Harbaugh made a 21-yard touchdown pass to Freddie Jones, but failed the two-point conversion attempt paving the way for the Raiders' Sebastian Janikowski to kick the winning field goal with 13 seconds left. In the final play of the game, following a 47-yard kickoff return by Ronney Jenkins, Marquez Pope intercepted Harbaugh's attempt at a 50-yard Hail Mary pass that was intended for Trevor Gaylor in the end zone. In that game, Harbaugh completed 25 of 35 passes for 222 yards, two touchdowns, and one interception and was sacked three times for 27 yards. The following game on November 5 (Week 10), San Diego lost its ninth straight in a 15–13 loss to the Seattle Seahawks. In the second quarter, Harbaugh lost two fumbles, both of which preceded 10-yard Seattle passing touchdowns. Having completed 22 of 32 passes for 236 yards, one touchdown, and one interception, he left the game after the third quarter due to groin and abdomen injuries.

Harbaugh played what would be his final career game in Week 11 (November 12), a 17–7 loss to the Miami Dolphins. In the final drive of the game he filled in poorly for an injured Ryan Leaf, completing only 2 of 5 passes for 19 yards and throwing an interception. By that time, coach Riley had relegated Harbaugh to emergency duty due to injuries including a mild hernia. Riley had planned to start Harbaugh for the next game on Week 12 (November 19), but decided to start Leaf instead.

=== Detroit Lions and Carolina Panthers ===
Harbaugh signed with the Detroit Lions prior to the 2001 season, where he was expected to back up incumbent starter Charlie Batch. However, on the eve of the regular season, the Lions cut him and traded for Ty Detmer. He closed out his NFL career with the Carolina Panthers in 2001, where he dressed for six games but did not play. The 2001 Panthers, like the Chargers the year before, finished with a 1–15 record.

=== Legacy ===
For his NFL career, Harbaugh played in 177 league games with 140 starts. He completed 2,305 of 3,918 passes for 26,288 yards with 129 touchdowns. Particularly during his time with Indianapolis, such as when he led the Colts to come-from-behind wins over the Chiefs and Chargers in the 1995–96 NFL playoffs and a near upset over the No. 2 AFC seed Steelers, he earned the nickname "Captain Comeback" (the second player to be so nicknamed after Roger Staubach) for his ability to win games in the fourth quarter when his team was significantly behind.

Harbaugh is second in the Bears' record book for completions with 1,023, while Jay Cutler holds the record with 1,034. Harbaugh also ranks second with 1,759 attempts and third in yards with 11,567. In January 2005, he was inducted into the Indianapolis Colts Ring of Honor as one of the most successful and popular players in the club's Indianapolis era.

== NFL career statistics ==
Legend
	Led the league
**Bold**	Career high

=== Regular season ===
Year	Team	Games			Passing								Rushing				Sacked		Fumbles	
Year	Team	GP	GS	Record	Cmp	Att	Pct	Yds	Y/A	TD	Int	Rtg	Att	Yds	Y/A	TD	Sck	SckY	Fum	Lost
1987	CHI	6	0	—	8	11	**72.7**	62	5.6	0	0	86.2	4	15	3.8	0	4	45	0	0
1988	CHI	10	2	1–1	47	97	48.5	514	5.3	0	2	55.9	19	110	5.8	1	6	49	1	0
1989	CHI	12	5	1–4	111	178	62.4	1,204	6.8	5	9	70.5	45	276	6.1	3	18	106	2	1
1990	CHI	14	14	10–4	180	312	57.7	2,178	7.0	10	6	81.9	51	321	**6.3**	**4**	31	206	8	5
1991	CHI	**16**	**16**	**11–5**	**275**	**478**	57.5	**3,121**	6.5	15	**16**	73.7	**70**	**338**	4.8	2	24	163	6	3
1992	CHI	**16**	13	5–8	202	358	56.4	2,486	6.9	13	12	76.2	47	272	5.8	1	31	167	6	3
1993	CHI	15	15	7–8	200	325	61.5	2,002	6.2	7	11	72.1	60	277	4.6	**4**	**43**	210	**15**	**7**
1994	IND	12	9	4–5	125	202	61.9	1,440	7.1	9	6	85.8	39	223	5.7	0	17	72	1	1
1995	IND	15	12	7–5	200	314	63.7	2,575	**8.2**	**17**	5	**100.7**	52	235	4.5	2	36	219	4	2
1996	IND	14	14	7–7	232	405	57.3	2,630	6.5	13	11	76.3	48	192	4.0	1	36	190	8	4
1997	IND	12	11	2–9	189	309	61.2	2,060	6.7	10	4	86.2	36	206	5.7	0	41	**256**	4	3
1998	BAL	14	12	5–7	164	293	56.0	1,839	6.3	12	11	72.9	40	172	4.3	0	23	145	7	1
1999	SD	14	12	6–6	249	434	57.4	2,761	6.4	10	14	70.6	34	126	3.7	0	37	208	12	3
2000	SD	7	5	0–5	123	202	60.9	1,416	7.0	8	10	74.6	16	24	1.5	0	14	96	5	2
2001	CAR	0	0	DNP																
Career		177	140	66–74	2,305	3,918	58.8	26,288	6.7	129	117	77.6	561	2,787	5.0	18	361	2,132	79	35

=== Postseason ===
Year	Team	Games			Passing								Rushing				Sacked		Fumbles	
Year	Team	GP	GS	Record	Cmp	Att	Pct	Yds	Y/A	TD	Int	Rtg	Att	Yds	Y/A	TD	Sck	SckY	Fum	Lost
1987	CHI	0	0	DNP																
1988	CHI	0	0	DNP																
1990	CHI	0	0	DNP																
1991	CHI	1	1	0–1	22	44	50.0	218	5.0	1	**2**	53.0	7	26	3.7	0	3	11	1	**1**
1995	IND	**3**	**3**	**2–1**	**49**	**87**	**56.3**	**554**	**6.4**	**4**	**2**	**81.3**	**20**	**87**	**4.4**	**1**	**7**	**52**	**2**	0
1996	IND	1	1	0–1	12	32	37.5	134	4.2	1	1	48.2	3	6	2.0	0	3	29	1	**1**
Career		5	5	2–3	83	163	50.9	906	5.6	6	5	67.2	30	119	4.0	1	13	92	4	2

== Coaching career ==
=== Western Kentucky ===
During his final eight seasons in the NFL (1994–2001), Harbaugh was an NCAA-certified unpaid assistant coach under his father Jack Harbaugh at Western Kentucky University (WKU). Serving as an offensive consultant, he scouted and recruited high school student-athletes throughout several states including Florida, Indiana and Illinois. He was involved in recruiting 17 players on WKU's 2002 Division I-AA national champion team. His father was a football coach for 18 years, including 14 years as head coach at WKU.

=== Oakland Raiders ===
Harbaugh was quarterback coach for the Oakland Raiders in 2002 and 2003 under Bill Callahan. During his tenure with the Raiders, Harbaugh coached starting quarterback Rich Gannon, who led the Raiders' run to Super Bowl XXXVII, won the 2002 AP NFL MVP award, and was selected to the 2003 Pro Bowl after the 2002 season. Other Raiders quarterbacks coached by Harbaugh include Rick Mirer, Tee Martin, Marques Tuiasosopo, and Rob Johnson.

=== San Diego ===
Prior to the 2004 season, Harbaugh was named head football coach at the University of San Diego. In his first year, he directed the Toreros to an overall mark of 7–4, including five straight wins to end the season. The following year, the team improved to 11–1 and won the 2005 Pioneer Football League championship. In 2006, USD again went 11–1, winning their second consecutive Pioneer League title in the process.

=== Stanford ===
Harbaugh was named the head football coach at Stanford University in December 2006, replacing Walt Harris. Harbaugh's father, Jack, was Stanford's defensive coordinator from 1980 to 1981, while Harbaugh attended Palo Alto High School, located directly across the street from Stanford Stadium.

Harbaugh stirred some intra-conference controversy in March 2007, when he was quoted as saying rival USC head coach "Pete Carroll's only got one more year, though. He'll be there one more year. That's what I've heard. I heard it inside the staff." Upon further questions, Harbaugh claimed he had heard it from staff at USC. The comment caused a rebuke from Carroll. (In fact, Carroll would be at USC for three more years.) At the Pacific-10 Conference media day on July 26, 2007, Harbaugh praised the Trojans, stating "There is no question in my mind that USC is the best team in the country and may be the best team in the history of college football." The declaration, especially in light of his earlier comment, garnered more media attention. Later in the season, Stanford defeated #1 USC 24–23 with a touchdown in the final minute. With USC being the favorite by 41 points, it was statistically the greatest upset in college football history.

In the 2008 season, Stanford went 5–7. In January 2009, Harbaugh was confirmed to have been interviewed by the New York Jets for the head coach position, although the job was eventually offered to Rex Ryan.

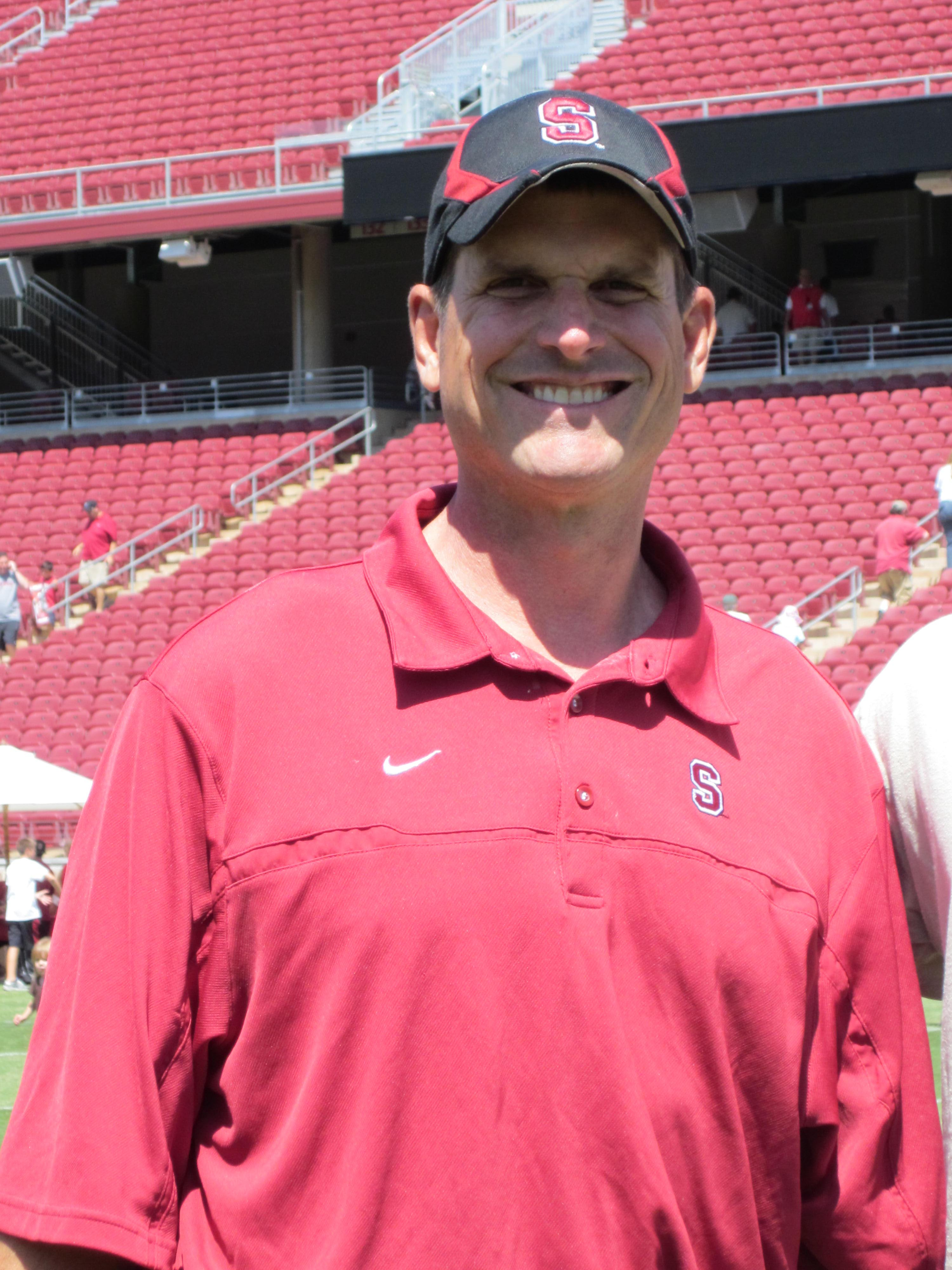
Harbaugh with Stanford in 2010

Although Stanford lost to USC in 2008, Harbaugh and the Stanford Cardinal upset USC at home again with a score of 55–21 on November 14, 2009. Stanford's 55 points was the most ever scored on USC in the Trojans' history until Oregon scored 62 in a 62–51 win over USC on November 3, 2012. It was Pete Carroll's first November loss as USC head coach. After an infamous "What's your deal?" verbal exchange with Carroll following that game, Harbaugh and Carroll would go on to speak favorably about each other as NFL coaches. From that game on, Stanford would buck the rivalry for the next decade (even after Harbaugh) left, winning eight of the next eleven matchups. In 2009, the Cardinal had a comeback season, finishing the regular season at 8–4 and receiving an invitation to play in the 2009 Sun Bowl, the Cardinal's first bowl appearance since 2001. Running back Toby Gerhart was named a Heisman Trophy finalist, finishing second to Mark Ingram II in the closest margin of voting in Heisman history. On December 13, 2009, Harbaugh was rewarded with a three-year contract extension through the 2014 season.

The 2010 season brought more success for Harbaugh and the Cardinal. The team went 11–1 in the regular season, with their only loss coming from Oregon, a team that was undefeated and earned a berth in the BCS National Championship Game. The first 11 win season in program history earned the Cardinal a #4 BCS ranking and a BCS bowl invitation to the Orange Bowl. Stanford defeated Virginia Tech 40–12 for the Cardinal's first bowl win since 1996 and the first BCS bowl victory in program history. Second year starting quarterback Andrew Luck was the runner-up to for the Heisman Trophy, the second year in a row that the runner-up was from Stanford. Harbaugh was named the winner of the Woody Hayes Coach of the Year Award.

=== San Francisco 49ers ===
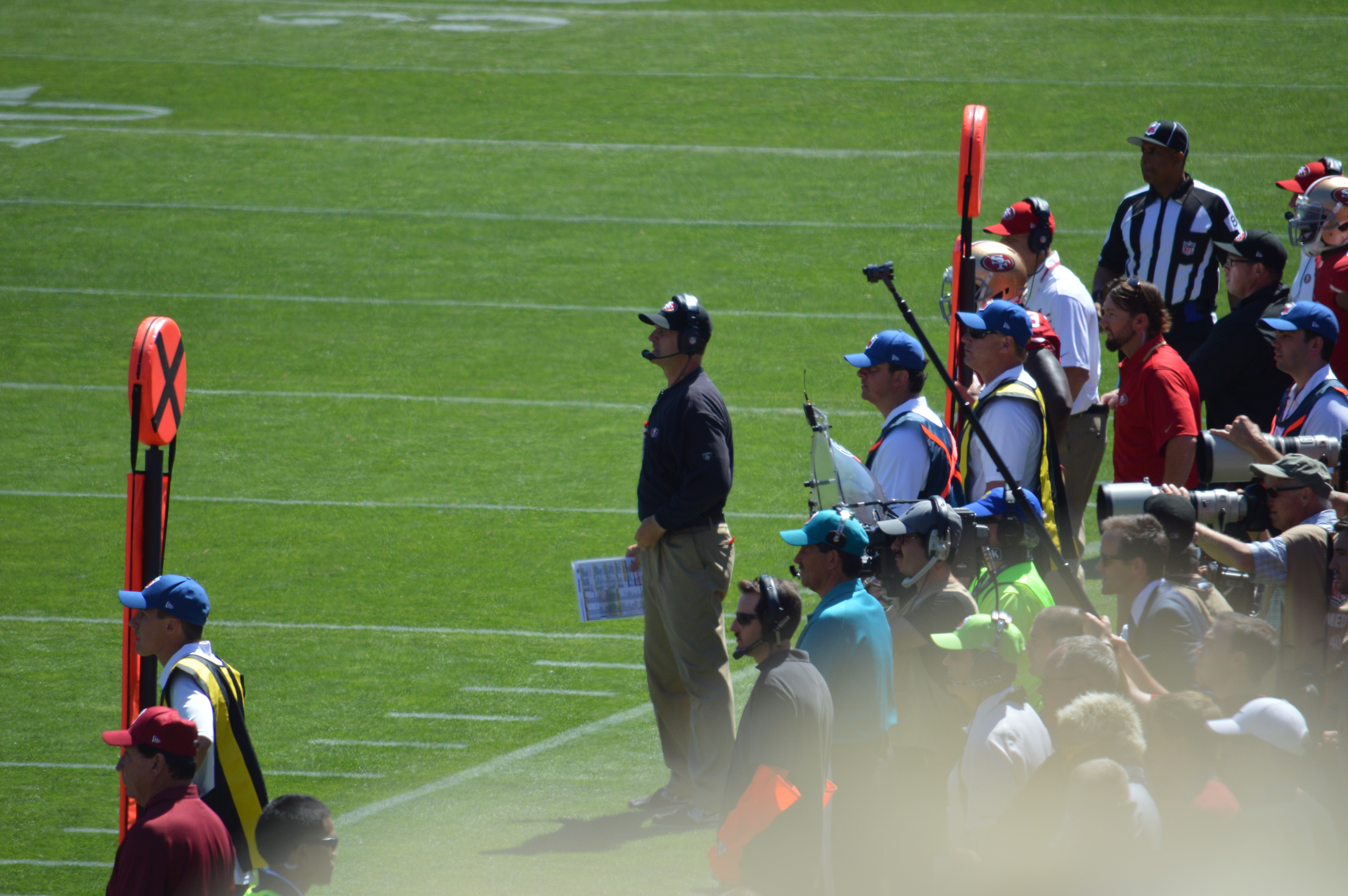
Harbaugh coaching the San Francisco 49ers in September 2013

==== 2011 season ====
On January 7, 2011, four days after winning the Orange Bowl, Harbaugh agreed to a five-year, $25 million contract to become the head coach for the San Francisco 49ers. He succeeded Jim Tomsula, who was interim head coach for only the last game of the preceding season after succeeding the fired Mike Singletary. Prior to Harbaugh's arrival, the 49ers had not had a winning season nor a playoff appearance since 2002.

Though the 49ers were expected to struggle in what was anticipated to be a rebuilding season, with a new scheme and many new players as well as shortened summer practices due to the lockout, Harbaugh led the team to a 13–3 record in the regular season, winning the NFC West division while finishing second overall in the NFC and bringing the team to the NFC Championship Game. This was the first time the 49ers had made the playoffs since 2002, generating widespread praise. On November 24, Harbaugh played his brother John and the Baltimore Ravens, losing the Thanksgiving showdown 16–6.

Harbaugh's work in San Francisco had resulted in an extremely successful season, revitalizing the career of quarterback Alex Smith and with defensive coordinator Vic Fangio creating one of the leading defensive squads of the 2011 season. The 49ers' season ended with a 20–17 loss in overtime to the eventual Super Bowl champion New York Giants in the NFC Championship. At the conclusion of the season, Harbaugh was named the AP NFL Coach of the Year. In addition, he was named Coach of the Year by the PFWA and Sporting News.

Although they would meet in Super Bowl XLVII one year later, Jim and his older brother John, at the time head coach of the Baltimore Ravens, nearly faced off in Super Bowl XLVI, both playing in the conference championship game on January 22, 2012, however John's Ravens fell to the New England Patriots 23-20 in the AFC Championship Game before Jim's 49ers lost to the New York Giants later that same day.

==== 2012 season ====
In the 2012 season, Harbaugh resolved a quarterback controversy by replacing incumbent starter Alex Smith with backup Colin Kaepernick. Smith was ranked third in the NFL in passer rating (104.1), led the league in completion percentage (70%), and had been 19–5–1 as a starter under Harbaugh, while Kaepernick was considered more dynamic with his scrambling ability and arm strength. Smith began 2012 with a 6–2 record as a starter before suffering a concussion in the following game. He missed the following game, and Kaepernick was 16 for 23 for 243 yards with two touchdowns in a 32–7 win over the Chicago Bears. Harbaugh was impressed with Kaepernick, and said "we have two quarterbacks that have a hot hand" while dismissing any rule that a player should not lose their starting job due to an injury. Smith was medically cleared to play the day before the next game, but Harbaugh chose not to rush him back and again started Kaepernick, who threw and ran for a touchdown in a 31–21 win over the New Orleans Saints. The following week, Harbaugh announced that Kaepernick would start for the 8–2–1 49ers, while also stating that the assignment was week-to-week and not necessarily permanent. However, Kaepernick remained the starter for the remainder of the season as the 49ers again qualified for the playoffs.

Harbaugh led the team to an 11–4–1 record in the regular season, winning back to back NFC West titles. Harbaugh's quarterback decision was on display in the first game of the playoffs. The 49ers won 45–31 in the Divisional Round over the Green Bay Packers, as Kaepernick had 444 yards of total offense (263 passing, 181 rushing) and four touchdowns. Kaepernick set the record for rushing yards by a quarterback in any NFL game with his 181-yard outburst against Green Bay. On January 20 in the NFC Championship, Harbaugh led the 49ers to a 28–24 win over the Atlanta Falcons, which sent the 49ers to Super Bowl XLVII, and on February 3, Harbaugh faced his older brother John and the Baltimore Ravens in the Super Bowl. It was the first time that the opposing teams' head coaches in the Super Bowl were brothers; the Ravens won the game with a score of 34–31 despite a third quarter comeback by the 49ers.

==== 2013 season ====
In the 2013 season, Harbaugh led the 49ers to a 12–4 regular-season record and a third consecutive appearance in both the playoffs and NFC Championship, where they lost to the Seattle Seahawks 23–17, who went on to win Super Bowl XLVIII. In doing so, Harbaugh became the first NFL head coach to reach a conference championship game in each of his first three seasons.

==== 2014 season ====
The 49ers had an 8–8 season in 2014, failing to reach the playoffs for the first time under the Harbaugh era. On October 5, it was rumored that Harbaugh would not return in 2015 regardless of that season's outcome, although owner Jed York denied the claims at the time. It has been suggested that Harbaugh, despite his success on the field, was involved in a power struggle with 49ers general manager Trent Baalke starting from the 2013 season onward. On December 28, 2014, the 49ers announced that they had mutually agreed to part ways with Harbaugh as their head coach. York claims Harbaugh and the 49ers agreed to mutually part ways immediately after a win over the Arizona Cardinals in the final week of the regular season. Harbaugh, however, later said: "I didn't leave the 49ers. I felt like the 49er hierarchy left me." He further added that the 49ers informed him that he would no longer be the 49ers coach after suffering a loss on December 14, but that he decided to remain as the team's head coach for the final two games of the season because "I wanted to finish what I started—what we started."

Harbaugh left the 49ers as one of their most successful head coaches in just four years, as well as becoming the first successful NFL head coach to depart for a college team. New head coach Jim Tomsula was fired after just one season in which the 49ers finished 5–11. Until the 2019 season, in which the 49ers went 13–3 and advanced to Super Bowl LIV, the 49ers had losing seasons every year following Harbaugh's departure.

=== Michigan ===
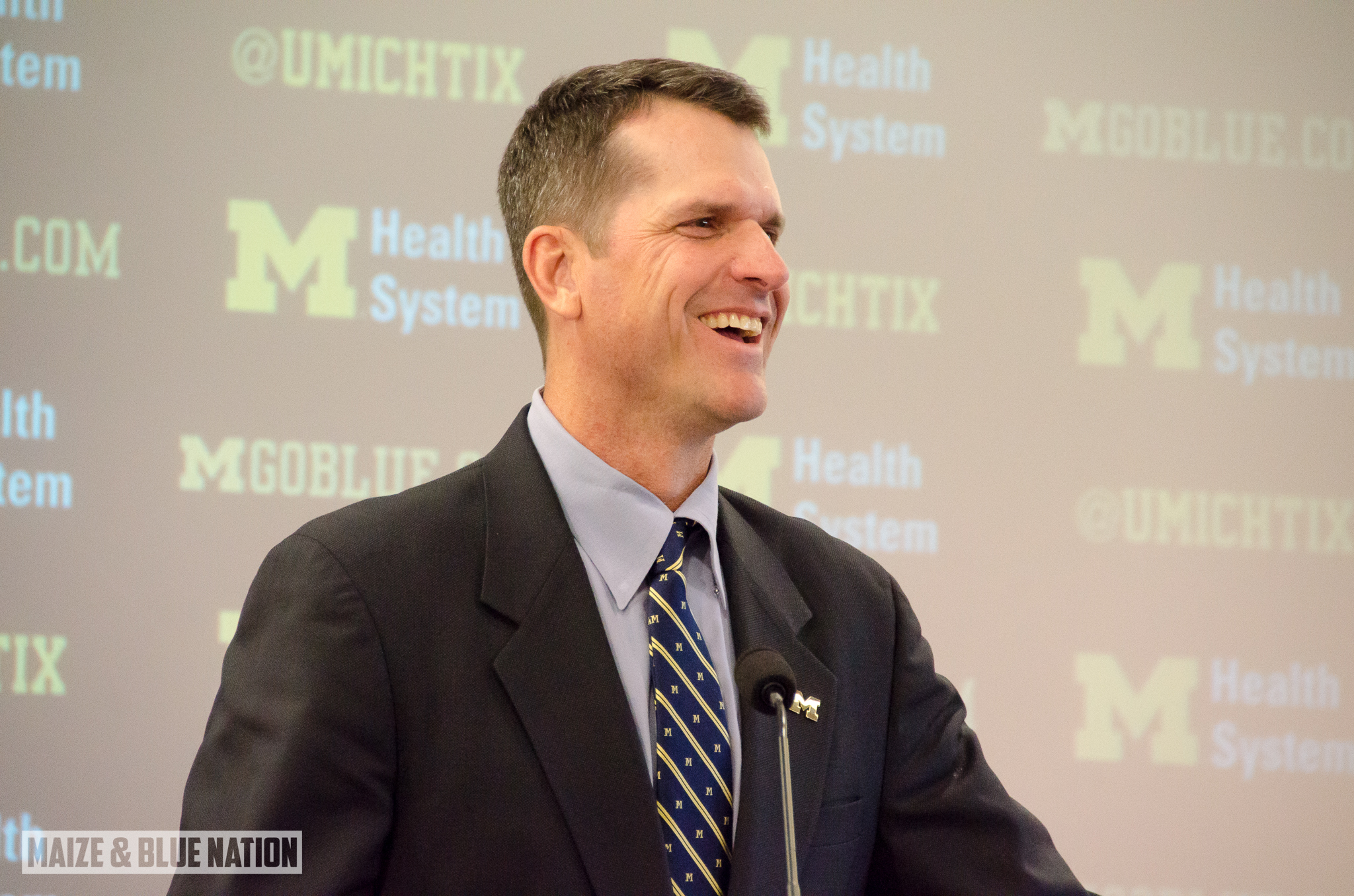
Harbaugh during his introductory press conference as Michigan's coach

==== Hiring ====
On December 30, 2014, Harbaugh was introduced by the University of Michigan as the school's new head football coach. His return to Michigan was the subject of a book, Endzone: The Rise, Fall, and Return of Michigan Football, by John U. Bacon.

==== 2015 season ====
On September 3, 2015, Harbaugh lost his first game as head coach of Michigan, a 24–17 road loss against Utah. On September 12, Michigan won 35–7 against Oregon State, giving Harbaugh his first win as Michigan's head coach. On September 26, Harbaugh led Michigan to a 31–0 victory over No. 22-ranked Brigham Young University, leading Michigan to move into #22 in the AP Poll. This was Michigan's first appearance in the AP Top 25 since 2013. On October 3, Harbaugh led the Wolverines to a 28–0 shutout win against the Maryland Terrapins, posting back to back shutouts for the first time since 2000. The following week, Michigan beat #13 Northwestern 38–0, making the Wolverines the first team with a pair of 30-point shutouts against ranked opponents since Notre Dame's 1966 championship team. He finished his first season as the Wolverines' head coach with a 10–3 record, with losses against Utah, Michigan State, and Ohio State, and a redeeming victory in the Citrus Bowl over No. 19 Florida, 41–7. After being tied, 7–7, in the first quarter, Michigan scored 34 unanswered points as they held Florida to just 28 yards in the second half.

==== 2016 season ====
Michigan was ranked 7th in the AP Poll to start the season. After defeating Hawaii in the opening game of the 2016 season, Michigan was ranked 5th in the AP Poll. It was the first time Michigan had been ranked in the top five since the start of the 2007 season. Michigan cruised through its non-conference slate before defeating #8 Wisconsin. This was Michigan's first win over a top ten ranked team since 2008. In week six, the Wolverines soundly defeated Rutgers 78–0, the third-largest margin of victory in program history and the largest margin since 1920. Three weeks later, Michigan defeated Michigan State on the road, its first victory in East Lansing since 2007. They then suffered their first loss of the season to Iowa, before beating Indiana for their 10th victory; Harbaugh is one of only two coaches in program history to win 10 games in each of his first two seasons as head coach, joining Fielding H. Yost (1901–02). The regular season finished with a highly anticipated matchup against #2 Ohio State, with a likely College Football Playoff bid on the line. In a game that went to two overtime periods, Ohio State defeated the Wolverines 30–27; Harbaugh said afterward he was "bitterly disappointed with the officiating", especially for a controversial 4th-and-1 call, and was reprimanded by the Big Ten with a $10,000 fine. Michigan finished the season in the Orange Bowl, where it lost 33–32 to #10 Florida State, after losing Heisman-finalist Jabrill Peppers before the game and losing two-time All-American Jake Butt early in the game. Michigan finished the season 10–3 and another third-place finish in their division.

==== 2017 season ====
Michigan finished the season in the Outback Bowl, losing 19–26 to South Carolina, becoming the only team in the Big Ten Conference to lose its bowl game in the 2017–2018 bowl season and giving them an 8–5 record on the year.

==== 2018 season ====
Michigan began the 2018 season ranked 14th in the AP Poll. They lost their first game of the season against No. 12 Notre Dame 17–24, but rebounded the next two weeks with a 49–3 win over Western Michigan University and a 45–20 win over SMU. Three weeks later, the 5–1 Wolverines faced the No. 15 Wisconsin Badgers in a Saturday night showdown. Michigan won the game 38–13, moving to No. 6 in the AP Poll. The next week, the Wolverines beat rival Michigan State 21–7, moving to 5th in the AP Poll. After a bye week, the Wolverines trampled Penn State 42–7, moving to 4th in both the AP poll and the College Football Playoff Rankings. They would stay at that ranking after a 31–20 win over Indiana that earned the Wolverines a share of the East Division title. Michigan lost at #10 Ohio State 62–39, denying Michigan a chance to play in the Big Ten Championship Game. Ohio State's 62 points set a record for points against Michigan in regulation. Harbaugh became the first Michigan coach to lose his first four starts against the Buckeyes. The Wolverines lost to the Florida Gators 41–15 in the Peach Bowl, finishing with another 10–3 season.

==== 2019 season ====
During Harbaugh's fifth season, the Wolverines lost to Wisconsin 35–14 and to Penn State 28–21, both on the road. Michigan won decisively against rivals Notre Dame 45–14 and Michigan State 44–10, but concluded the regular season with a loss to then #1-ranked Ohio State by a score of 56–27 to end the regular season. When asked about the gap between the two schools, his reply was testy: "I'll answer your questions, not your insults." The Wolverines finished the season in the Citrus Bowl, where they lost to Alabama, 35–16. Michigan finished the season 9–4 overall.

==== 2020 season ====
Michigan's 2020 season was significantly shortened due to the Big Ten Conference's policies regarding the COVID-19 pandemic. On November 14, Michigan hosted Wisconsin and Michigan suffered its largest halftime deficit at home since Michigan Stadium opened in 1927 (28–0), as well as its largest home loss (49–11) since 1935. On November 28, 2020, Michigan hosted Penn State and for the first time in Michigan football history, lost to a team that was 0–5 or worse. Michigan was winless at home during the 2020 season, marking the first time in program history that Michigan did not win any games at home.

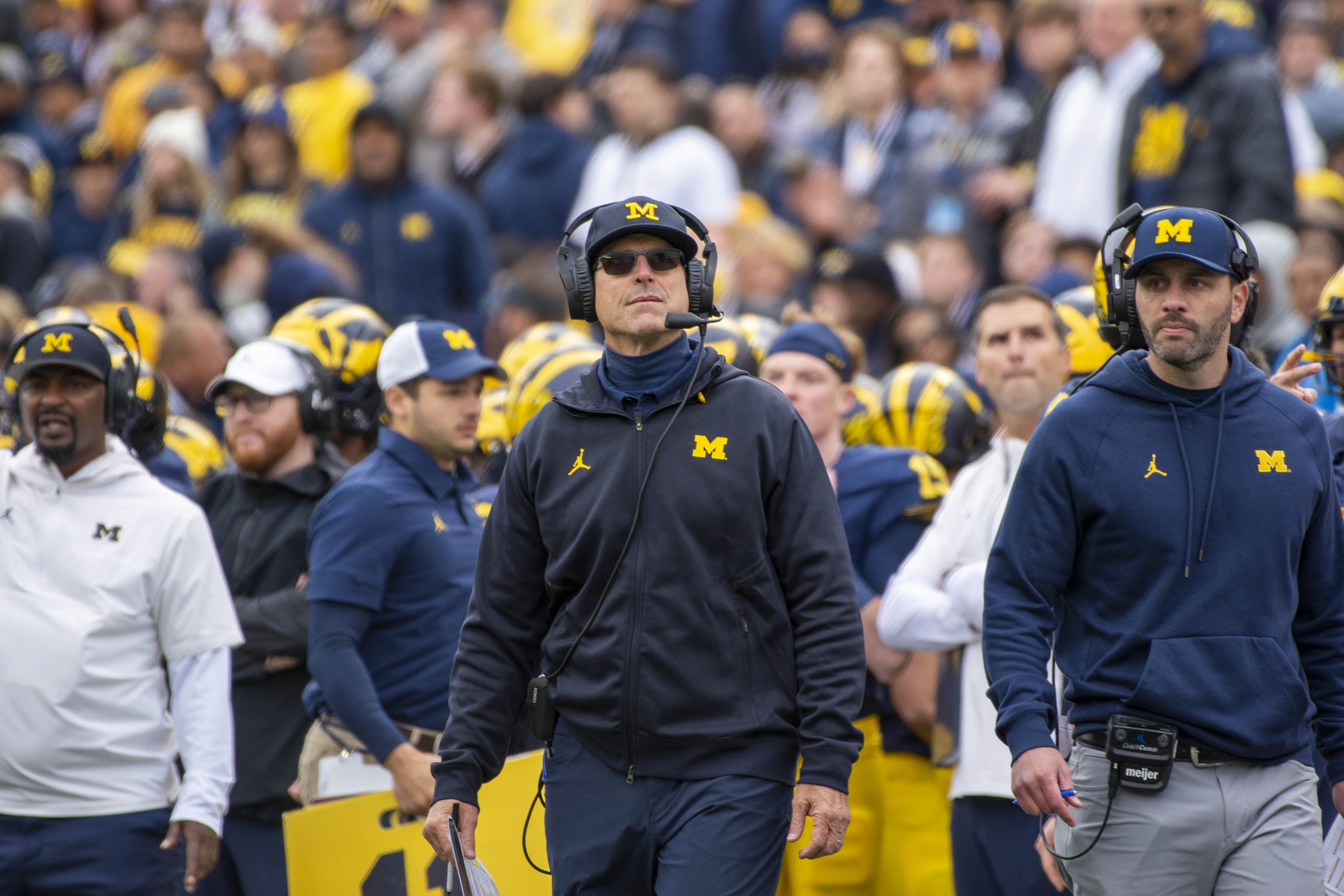
Harbaugh in 2021

==== 2021 season ====
On January 8, 2021, Michigan signed Harbaugh to a four-year contract extension through the 2025 season. Michigan, led by Harbaugh, finished the regular season 11–1. The Wolverines beat Western Michigan, Washington, Northern Illinois, Rutgers, Wisconsin, Nebraska, Northwestern, Indiana, No. 23 Penn State, and Maryland. Michigan's lone loss came in a top-10 matchup on the road at Michigan State. Following the loss, according to Harbaugh, the Big Ten acknowledged that there were errors made by the officials on multiple calls, including one that could have resulted in a Michigan touchdown. Michigan ended the regular season with a 42–27 victory over Ohio State, giving Harbaugh his first win over Ohio State and his second Big Ten East divisional title. Michigan advanced to the Big Ten Championship Game for the first time, where the Wolverines defeated Iowa in Indianapolis, 42–3, earning an Orange Bowl berth against Georgia in the College Football Playoff. Following the season he was named the Associated Press College Football Coach of the Year Award. By winning the award, Michigan became the first school to win both the AP coach of the year in men's basketball (Juwan Howard) and football since the football award was established in 1998.

In January 2022, reports emerged that Harbaugh would take the Las Vegas Raiders head coaching job if he was offered it. Although he never interviewed with the Raiders, Harbaugh did interview with the Minnesota Vikings in late January and was a lead candidate for a head coaching job. Reports emerged that Harbaugh was preparing to accept the Vikings head coaching position if he was offered it, but he ultimately did not receive an offer following his second interview with the team, and informed the University of Michigan that he would be returning to coach the Wolverines in the 2022 season.

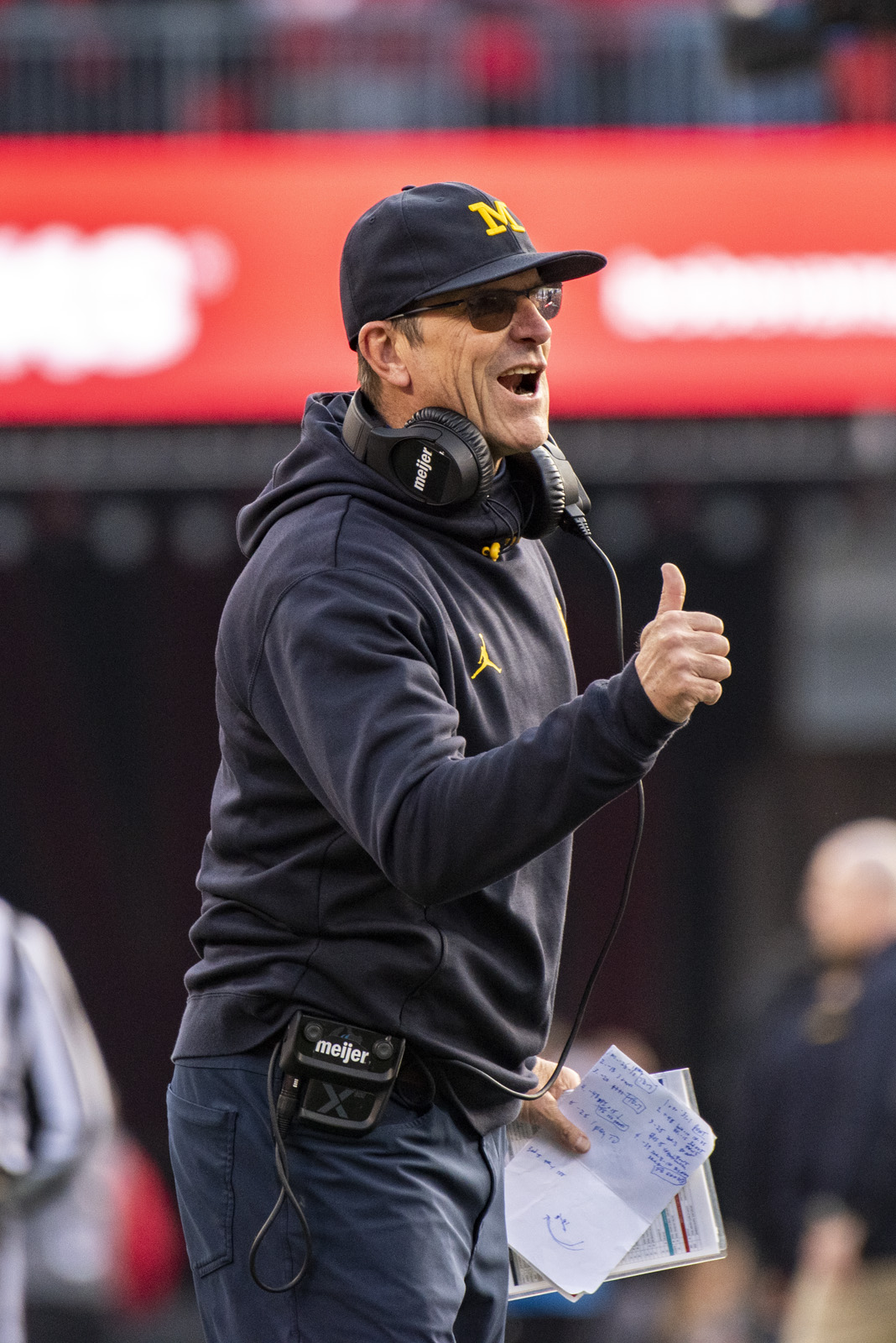
Harbaugh during The Game, 2022

==== 2022 season ====
The 2022 Wolverines began the season ranked sixth and eighth in the coaches' and AP polls, respectively. They climbed into the top five in both polls as they opened the season with a seven-game winning streak, including a 27–14 win at Iowa on October 1 – the program's first at Kinnick Stadium since 2005 – and a dominating 41–17 win over previously unbeaten Penn State on October 15.

The Wolverines continued their winning streak on October 29 by defeating Michigan State 29–7, to reclaim the Paul Bunyan Trophy. The team then defeated Rutgers 52–17, followed by a 34–3 win over Nebraska to reach 10–0 – the program's best start to a season in Harbaugh's tenure, and best overall since 2006.

The Wolverines improved to 11–0 by defeating Illinois on a last-minute field goal, 19–17, then won a second straight Big Ten East Division title with a 45–23 victory over Ohio State. It was the Wolverines' first 12 win regular season since 1905, fourth 12 win season overall and their first victory in Columbus, Ohio, since 2000. Harbaugh was named Big Ten Coach of the Year for the 2022 season.

On December 3, the Wolverines reached 13–0 for the first time in school history by winning the Big Ten Championship Game over Purdue, 43–22. The following day, Michigan was awarded its second consecutive College Football Playoff bid, seeded second and placed in the Fiesta Bowl.

On December 31, the Wolverines lost their semifinal match in the Fiesta Bowl to TCU, 51–45, to end the 2022 season 13–1.

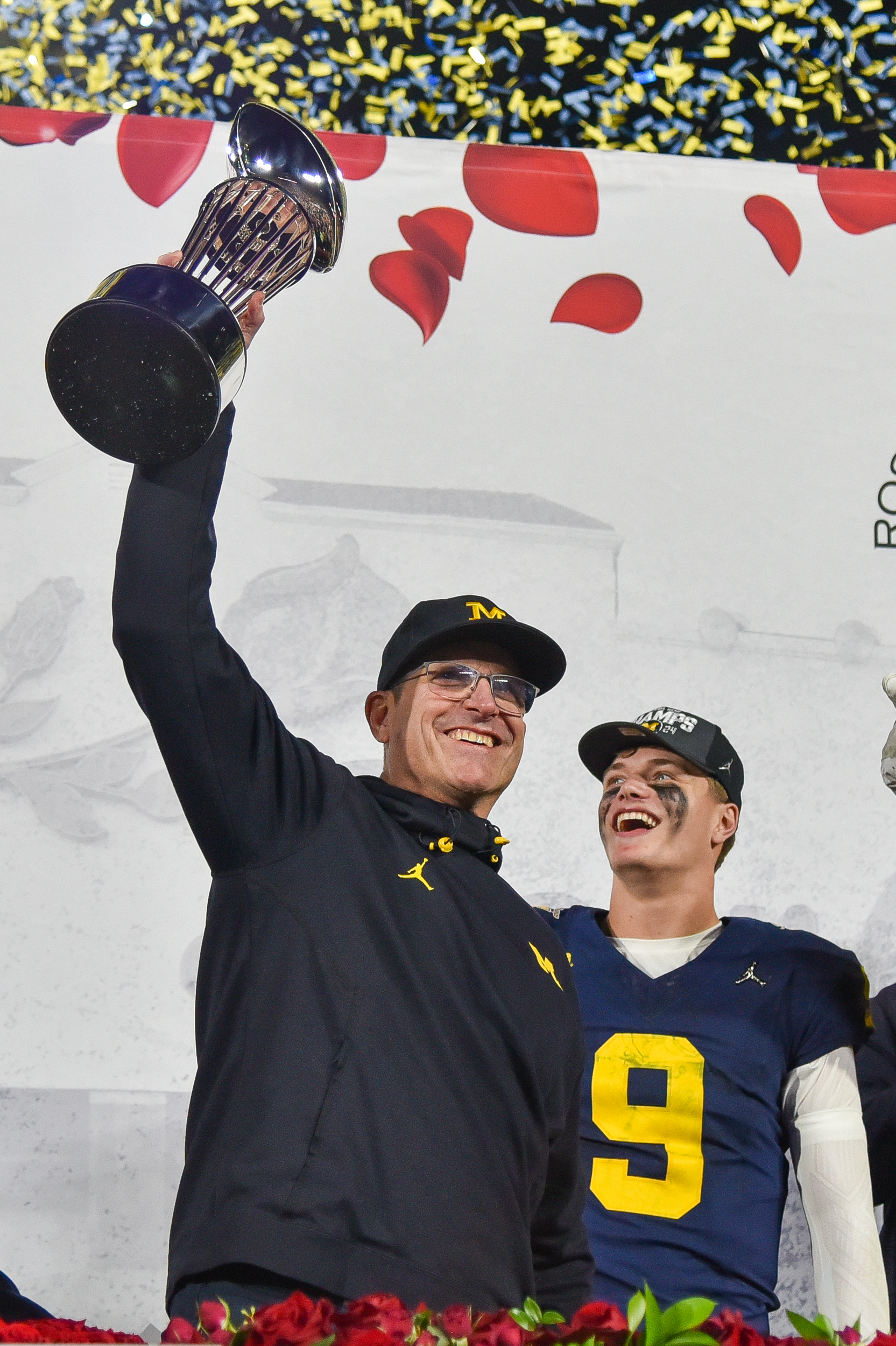
Harbaugh lifts the 2024 Rose Bowl trophy

==== 2023 season ====
On August 23, 2023, Michigan announced that it was self-imposing a suspension on Harbaugh for the first three games of the 2023 season due to violating recruiting regulations. Michigan won all three games in his absence.

Harbaugh returned to lead Michigan to six straight victories, including a 49–0 win at Michigan State, the largest margin of victory in that rivalry since 1947.

On November 10, the Big Ten Conference announced another three-game suspension against Harbaugh, as part of the investigation into the Michigan Wolverines football sign-stealing scandal. On November 23, Michigan informed the NCAA that they would credit Harbaugh with the win–loss record from the three games to conclude the regular season. Despite the suspensions, Michigan went undefeated in the regular season, including a 30–24 victory over Ohio State.

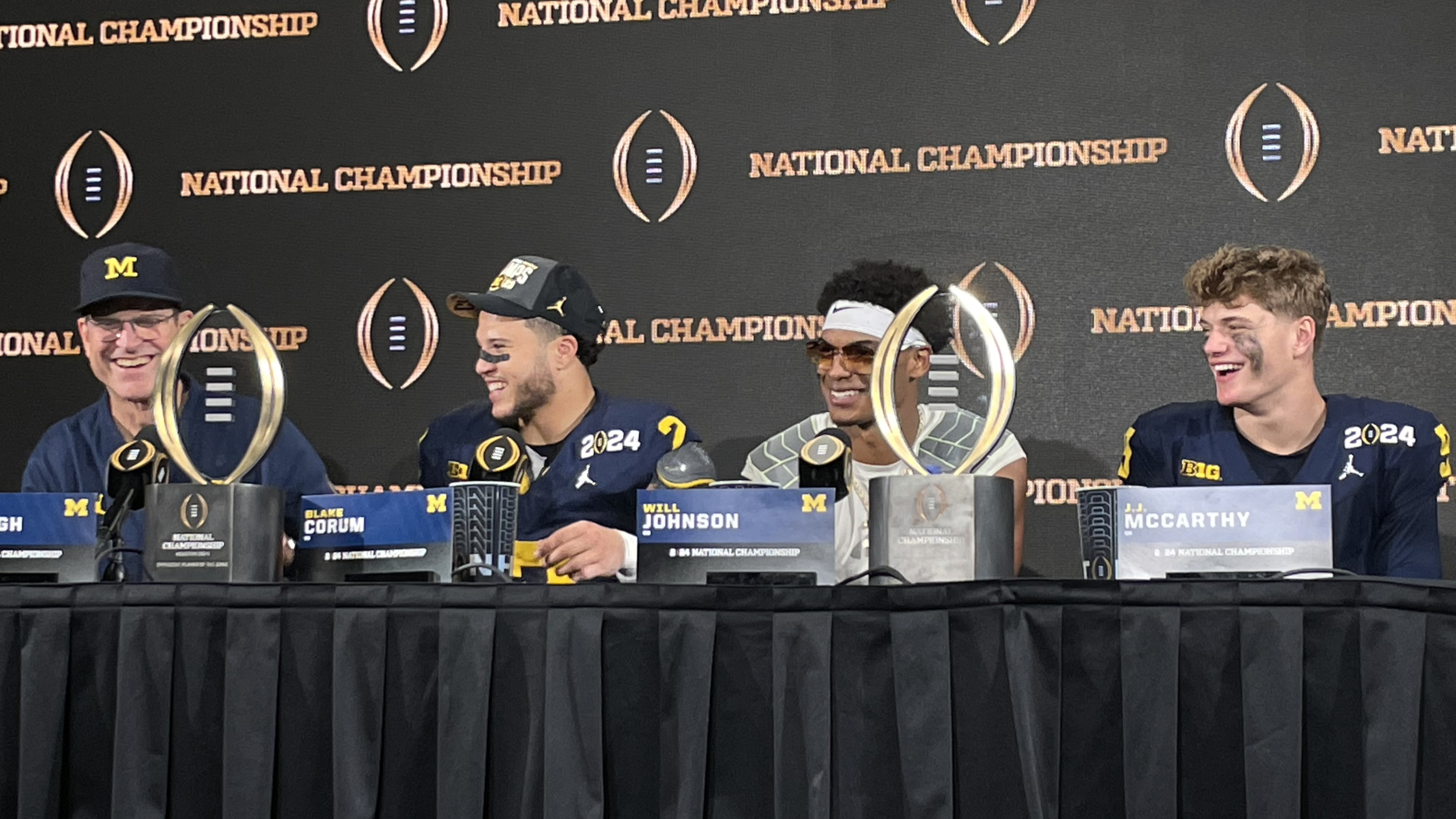
Harbaugh (first from left) alongside Blake Corum, Will Johnson, and J. J. McCarthy at a post-game press conference after winning the 2024 CFP Championship

Harbaugh resumed as head coach to lead Michigan to a 26–0 win over Iowa in the Big Ten Championship, a 27–20 overtime win over Alabama in the Rose Bowl, and a 34–13 win over Washington in the CFP National Championship on January 8, 2024. The win gave Michigan its 12th claimed national championship in school history, their first since 1997, and first undisputed title since 1948.

Harbaugh served as head coach for 9 games and was officially credited with 12 wins during Michigan's 15–0 national championship season.

On August 7, 2024, Harbaugh was given a four-year show-cause order from the NCAA to be enforced until August 6, 2028, after he was found to have committed "unethical conduct" in 2021 by violating NCAA recruitment rules which were enacted during the COVID-19 dead period. If Harbaugh were to take another collegiate job while the show-cause is in effect, he would be suspended for the first season of his return and would be barred from athletics-related activities (including team travel, practice, video study, recruiting and team meetings) until the order expires.

On August 15, 2025, Harbaugh was given an additional 10-year show-cause order that will run consecutively with his previous four-year show-cause order for his failure to promote compliance and monitor his staff in regards to the illegal scouting and sign-stealing operation as well as his lack of cooperation in request for records and interviews after he took the Chargers job. This additional show-cause will start at the end of the first show-cause and will run until August 6, 2038. As with the 2024 infractions case, if Harbaugh returns to the collegiate ranks before the show-cause ends, he will be suspended for the first season of his return.

=== Los Angeles Chargers ===
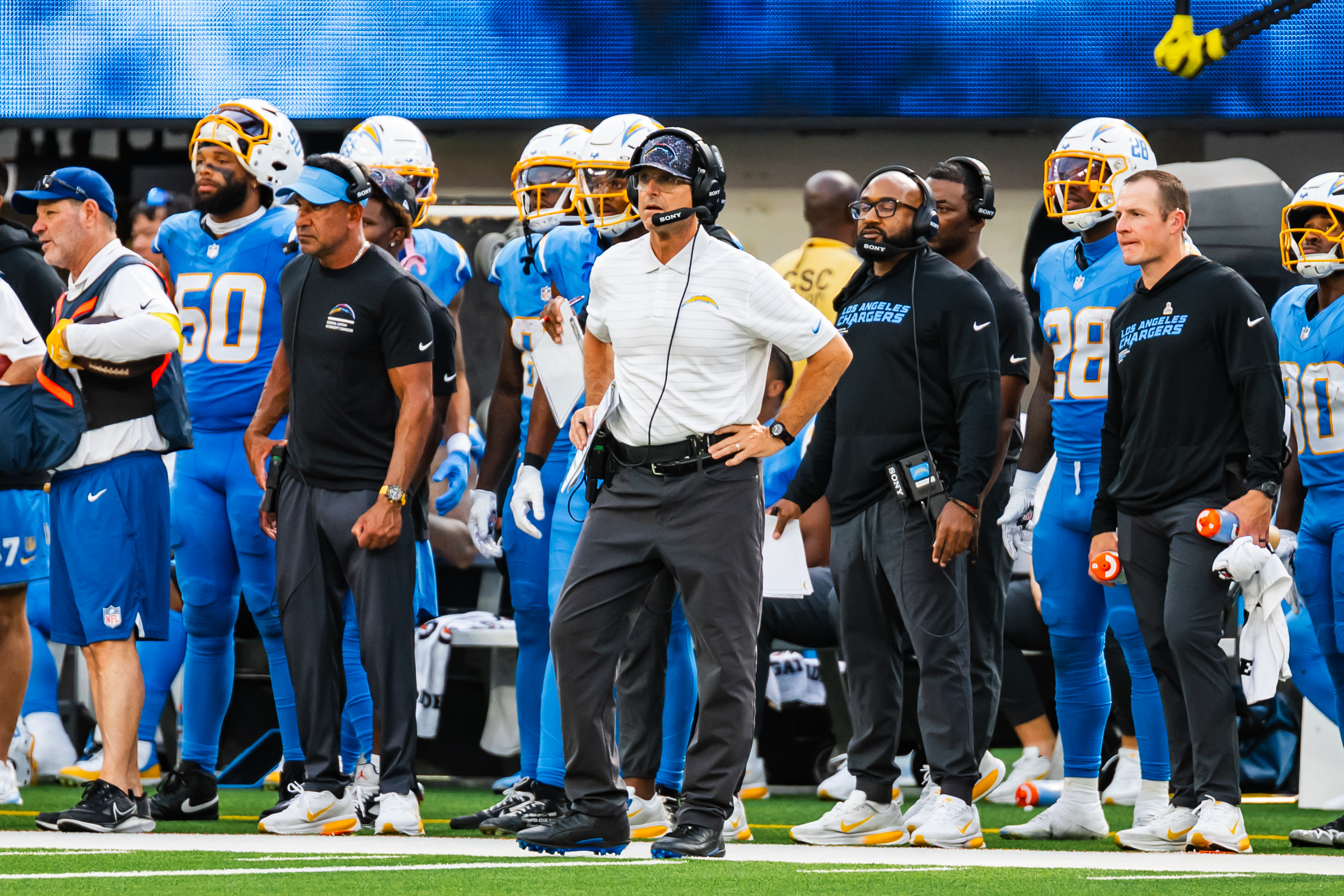
Harbaugh on the Los Angeles Chargers sideline

On January 24, 2024, Harbaugh was hired by the Los Angeles Chargers as their head coach.

On September 8, 2024, in Harbaugh's coaching debut with the franchise, the Chargers defeated the Las Vegas Raiders 22–10 as Harbaugh won his first NFL game as a head coach since December 2014. Harbaugh led the Chargers to an 11–6 record and a postseason berth. The Chargers lost to the Houston Texans 32–12 in the Wild Card Round.

In the 2025 season, Harbaugh led the Chargers to another 11–6 record, which was good enough for second in the AFC West and a playoff berth. The Chargers fell 16–3 to the New England Patriots in the Wild Card Round.

== Coaching tree ==
Twenty one of Harbaugh's assistants have been hired as head coaches in the NFL or NCAA:

- Lance Anderson: Utah Tech (2024–present)
- Don Brown: UMass (2022–2024)
- D.J. Durkin: Maryland (2016–2018)
- Vic Fangio: Denver Broncos (2019–2021)
- Jedd Fisch: Arizona (2021–2023), Washington (2024-present)
- Maurice Linguist: Buffalo (2021–2023)
- Derek Mason: Vanderbilt (2014–2020), Middle Tennessee (2024-present)
- Mike Macdonald: Seattle Seahawks (2024–present)
- Jim McElwain: Central Michigan (2019–2024)
- Jesse Minter: Baltimore Ravens (2026–present)
- Sherrone Moore: Michigan (2024–2025)
- Biff Poggi: Charlotte (2023–2024)
- Brian Polian: Nevada (2013–2016)
- Tavita Pritchard: Stanford (2026–present)
- Mike Sanford Jr.: Western Kentucky (2017–2018)
- Scott Shafer: Syracuse (2013–2015)
- David Shaw: Stanford (2011–2022)
- Willie Taggart: Western Kentucky (2010–2012), South Florida (2013–2016), Oregon (2017), Florida State (2018–2019), Florida Atlantic (2020–2022)
- Jim Tomsula: San Francisco 49ers (2015)
- Tyrone Wheatley: Morgan State (2019–2021)
- Paul Wulff: Cal Poly Mustangs (2023–2025)

== Head coaching record ==
=== College ===
Year	Team	Overall	Conference	Standing	Bowl/playoffs	Coaches^{#}	AP^{°}
San Diego Toreros (Pioneer Football League) (2004–2006)
2004	San Diego	7–4	3–1	2nd (North)			
2005	San Diego	11–1	4–0	1st (North)			
2006	San Diego	11–1	7–0	1st	W Gridiron Classic		
San Diego:		29–6	14–1				
Stanford Cardinal (Pacific-10 Conference) (2007–2010)
2007	Stanford	4–8	3–6	T–7th			
2008	Stanford	5–7	4–5	T–6th			
2009	Stanford	8–5	6–3	T–2nd	L Sun		
2010	Stanford	12–1	8–1	2nd	W Orange^{†}	4	4
Stanford:		29–21	21–15				
Michigan Wolverines (Big Ten Conference) (2015–2023)
2015	Michigan	10–3	6–2	3rd (East)	W Citrus	11	12
2016	Michigan	10–3	7–2	3rd (East)	L Orange^{†}	10	10
2017	Michigan	8–5	5–4	4th (East)	L Outback		
2018	Michigan	10–3	8–1	T–1st (East)	L Peach^{†}	14	14
2019	Michigan	9–4	6–3	3rd (East)	L Citrus	19	18
2020	Michigan	2–4	2–4	T–5th (East)			
2021	Michigan	12–2	8–1	T–1st (East)	L Orange^{†}	3	3
2022	Michigan	13–1	9–0	1st (East)	L Fiesta^{†}	3	3
2023	Michigan	12–0 (Note: Harbaugh was suspended for the first three games of the 2023 season. Jesse Minter served as interim head coach for the first game of the season, Jay Harbaugh and Mike Hart were interim co-head coaches for the second game, and Sherrone Moore served as interim head coach for the third game. Those first three games were credited to the records of the interim coaches. Harbaugh was later suspended a second time, for the final three games of the regular season. Moore served as acting head coach for those games at the end of the regular season, but the games were credited to Harbaugh's record.)	9–0	1st (East)	W Rose ^{†}, W CFP NCG^{†}	1	1
Michigan:		86–25	60–17				
Total:		144–52					
National championship Conference title Conference division title or championship game berth
^{†}Indicates BCS or CFP / New Years' Six bowl.; ^{#}Rankings from final Coaches Poll.; ^{°}Rankings from final AP Poll.

=== NFL ===
Team	Year	Regular season					Postseason			
Team	Year	Won	Lost	Ties	Win %	Finish	Won	Lost	Win %	Result
SF	2011	13	3	0	.813	1st in NFC West	1	1	.500	Lost to New York Giants in NFC Championship Game
SF	2012	11	4	1	.719	1st in NFC West	2	1	.667	Lost to Baltimore Ravens in Super Bowl XLVII
SF	2013	12	4	0	.750	2nd in NFC West	2	1	.667	Lost to Seattle Seahawks in NFC Championship Game
SF	2014	8	8	0	.500	3rd in NFC West	—	—	—	—
SF total		44	19	1	.695		5	3	.625	
LAC	2024	11	6	0	.647	2nd in AFC West	0	1	.000	Lost to Houston Texans in AFC Wild Card Game
LAC	2025	11	6	0	.647	2nd in AFC West	0	1	.000	Lost to New England Patriots in AFC Wild Card Game
LAC	2026	1	8	0	.000	TBD in AFC West	0	0	.000	
LAC total		22	20	0	.524		0	2	.000	
Total		66	39	1	.629		5	5	.500	

== Personal life ==
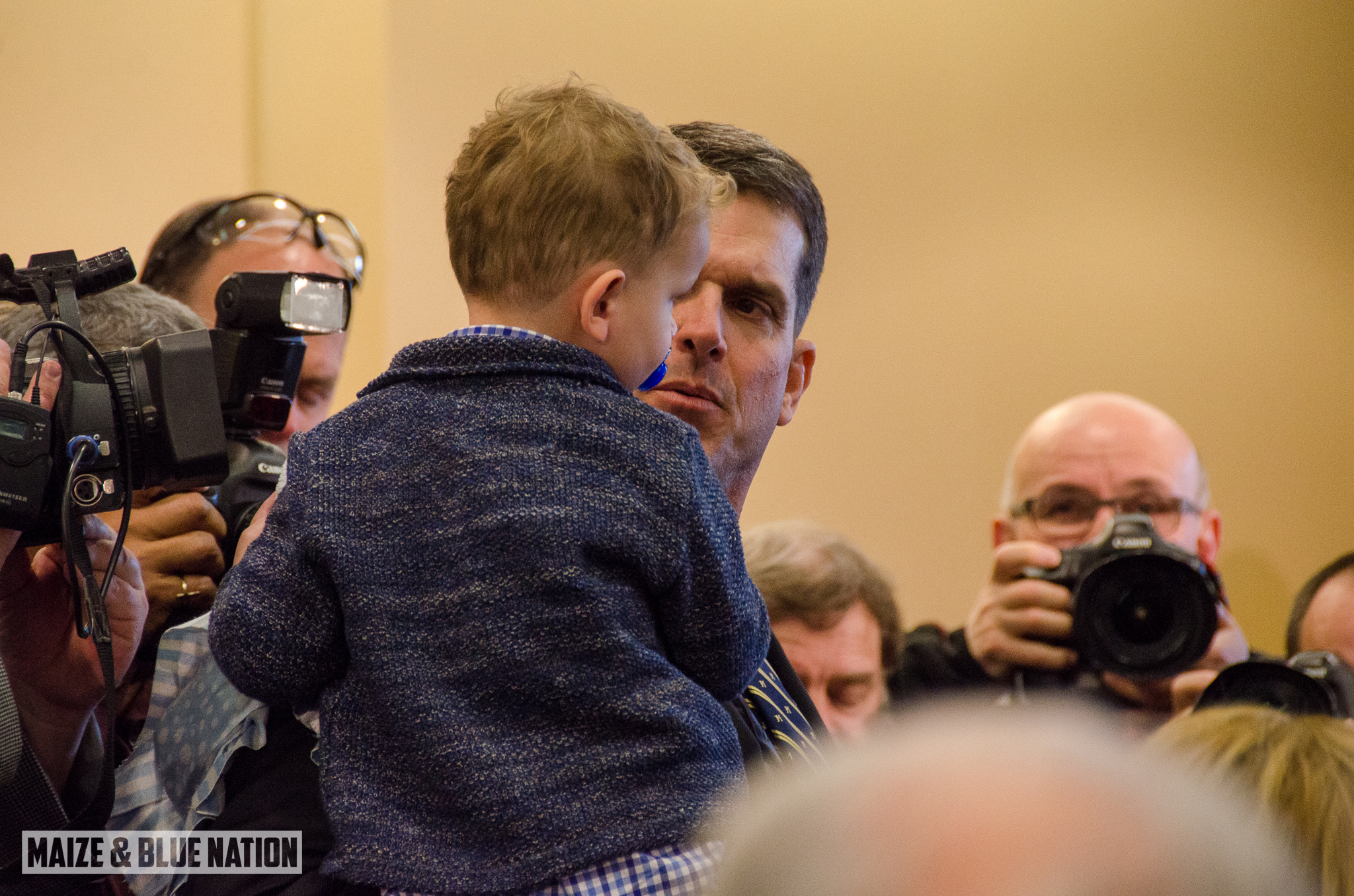
Harbaugh with his son

Harbaugh comes from a coaching family and is the son of college football coach Jack Harbaugh. He has seven children. From his first marriage, to Miah Burke (m. 1996–2006), he has sons Jay (a graduate of Oregon State University and the special teams coordinator for the Seattle Seahawks), and James (a graduate of the University of Michigan's School of Music, Theatre & Dance); and a daughter, Grace (a water polo player and student at the Ross School of Business). From his second marriage, to Sarah Feuerborn Harbaugh (m. 2008), he has two daughters, Addison and Katherine, and two sons, Jack (named after his grandfather) and John (named after his uncle). Harbaugh is a Catholic who has done charity work in Piura, Peru.

Jim Harbaugh's older brother, John, was the head coach of the Baltimore Ravens, and they became the first pair of brothers to serve as head coaches in NFL history, facing each other in the Thanksgiving Classic game in 2011 and Super Bowl XLVII on February 3, 2013, both of which Jim eventually lost.

In 1994, Harbaugh appeared as a cowboy in the Western/science fiction show The Adventures of Brisco County, Jr. He also made an appearance on the popular TV show Saved by the Bell: The New Class in 1996, playing the cousin of the character Screech.

Harbaugh was the co-owner of Panther Racing in the IndyCar Series. The main car for the team carried Harbaugh's old jersey number, 4. When the team won the 2001 and 2002 IRL championship, the team, which had the option of going to No. 1, chose instead to keep the No. 4 for its association with Harbaugh's career.

On October 30, 2005, Harbaugh was arrested for DUI after running a stop sign in Encinitas, California. He initially pleaded not guilty, but later entered into a plea deal. He pleaded guilty to a charge of reckless driving and was sentenced to three years of probation, a $1,300 fine and a drunken-driving educational program. The San Diego Union-Tribune reported his blood-alcohol level was .09.

In November 2012, Harbaugh had a cardioversion procedure to correct an arrhythmia (i.e., an abnormal heartbeat rhythm).

In 2018, Harbaugh portrayed himself on the Comedy Central series Detroiters in the episode "Little Caesars".

In January 2025, it was announced that Harbaugh would undergo a cardiac ablation and hip replacement.

=== Advocacy ===
Harbaugh has championed equal access to justice for Americans through his involvement with the Legal Services Corporation (LSC). On June 13, 2017, Harbaugh spoke in Washington, D.C., in the Senate Building about the gap in access to justice for low-income earning Americans which was showcased in the 2017 LSC report, "The Justice Gap: Measuring the Unmet Civil Legal Needs of Low-Income Americans."

Harbaugh has also stated his opposition to abortion. In a podcast interview in April 2020, Harbaugh labeled medical abortion as "horrendous" and said, "And lastly, abortion—we talk about sanctity of life, yet we live in a society that aborts babies. There can't be anything more horrendous." In July 2022, speaking at an anti-abortion event Harbaugh said, "Have the courage to let the unborn be born".

You got Jim Harbaugh, the coach of Michigan football, marching today. That's not something that was happening five to six years ago. Although Jim I know, and he's been on the right side of this issue for quite some time.

— President Obama on George Floyd protests, June 2, 2020

In the aftermath of the murder of George Floyd by an on-duty police officer, Harbaugh expressed his outrage and said, "All injustice should be confronted and punished. It has to be equal and fair to all, and no one can be above the law." On June 2, 2020, a week after Floyd's murder, Harbaugh participated in an anti-police brutality commemorative protest in Ann Arbor. Michigan offensive coach Josh Gattis separately thanked Harbaugh and his family for their impact on African American coaches and players, stating "in challenging times of racial inequality and injustice I am even more thankful for the Harbaugh Family!" Gattis credited Harbaugh for "the fairness and promotion of black coaches in leadership roles like David Shaw, Derek Mason, Willie Taggart, Jim Caldwell, Pep Hamilton" and himself. Harbaugh's participation in the equality and anti-brutality protest was also singled out by former president Barack Obama, who praised him for "being on the right side of this issue."

== See also ==
- List of NCAA major college football yearly passing leaders
