= 2004 San Diego Toreros football team =

American college football season

2004 San Diego Toreros football
- Conference: Pioneer Football League
- North Division
- Record: 7–4 (3–1 PFL)
- Head coach: Jim Harbaugh (1st season)
- Home stadium: Torero Stadium

2004 Pioneer Football League standings
	Conf.			Overall
Team	W		L	W		L
North Division
Drake xy$	4	–	0	10	–	2
San Diego	3	–	1	7	–	4
Dayton	2	–	2	7	–	3
Valparaiso	1	–	3	5	–	6
Butler	0	–	4	1	–	10
South Division
Morehead State xy	2	–	1	6	–	6
Jacksonville x	2	–	1	3	–	7
Davidson	1	–	2	2	–	7
Austin Peay	1	–	2	2	–	9
Championship: Drake 20, Morehead State 17
$ – Conference champion; x – Division champion/co-champions; y – Championship game participant

The 2004 San Diego Toreros football team represented the University of San Diego as a member of the North Division of the Pioneer Football League (PFL) during the 2004 NCAA Division I-AA football season. In their first year under head coach Jim Harbaugh, the Toreros compiled a 7–4 record and outscored their opponents 397 to 266.

== Schedule ==
Date	Time	Opponent	Site	Result	Attendance	Source
September 4		at Azusa Pacific*	Torero Stadium; San Diego, CA	L 17–24		
September 11		at Holy Cross*	Fitton Field; Worcester, MA	W 37–31	5,471	
September 18		Penn*	Torero Stadium; San Diego, CA	L 18–61	4,012	
September 25		Princeton*	Torero Stadium; San Diego, CA	L 17–24	3,528	
October 2		Southern Oregon*	Torero Stadium; San Diego, CA	W 51–10		
October 9		at Drake	Drake Stadium; Des Moines, IA	L 38–41	5,255	
October 16		Valparaiso	Torero Stadium; San Diego, CA	W 49–14		
October 23	7:00 p.m.	Davidson	Torero Stadium; San Diego, CA	W 56–0	3,287	
October 30		at Butler	Sellick Bowl; Indianapolis, IN	W 41–12	1,177	
November 6		Dayton	Torero Stadium; San Diego, CA	W 38–35		
November 13		Wagner*	Torero Stadium; San Diego, CA	W 35–14	3,316	
*Non-conference game; All times are in Pacific time

== Roster ==
2004 San Diego Toreros football team roster
Players
Coaches
Offense

Pos.	#	Name	Class
WR	1	Michael Gasperson	Jr
RB	4	Baxter Box	Sr
QB	7	Walter Cale	So
TE	8	Dustin Owen	Jr
WR	10	Nick Garton	Jr
QB	11	Joshua Johnson	Fr
RB	12	Deshon Benton	Fr
QB	13	Ryan Maine	Jr
WR	14	Adam Hannula	Jr
FB	15	Brenden Nakata	So
QB	16	Todd Mortensen	GS
QB	17	Chris Jansen	Fr
QB	18	David Perez	So
TE	19	Chris Ramsey	Fr
RB	23	Josh Denton	Fr
WR	26	Mike DeVan	Fr
TE	27	Matt Koller	Jr
WR	29	Ryan Matthews	Fr
RB	31	Brian Beckord	Fr
RB	32	Kevin Herron	Fr
RB	33	Evan Harney	Jr
RB	36	JT Rogan	Fr
RB	38	Jon Polk	So
TE	39	Brett O'Connor	Fr
FB	40	David Greer	Fr
TE	42	Mitch Ryan	Fr
RB	47	DeAndre Hanson	So
OL	51	Kaea Simeona	So
OL	60	Chris Gianelli	Fr
OL	63	Jordan Paopao	Fr
OL	65	Ricardo Arredondo	So
OL	68	James Dunne	So
OL	70	Matt Collins	Sr
OL	71	Josh Sanders	Jr
OL	73	Reis Rosenbledt	Fr
OL	74	Rusty Higbie	Sr
OL	76	Michael Erskine	Fr
OL	77	Deene Kabiling	Fr
OL	78	Jason McFarland	Fr
WR	80	Kenny Stivers	Fr
WR	81	Wes Doyle	Fr
TE	83	Zach May	Fr
WR	84	Jacques Lazarus	So
WR	86	Thomas Leon	Fr
WR	87	Eric Gregg	So
WR	88	Kellen Henry	Fr
TE	91	Anthony Romanelli	Fr

Defense

Pos.	#	Name	Class
DB		Jason Ching	Fr
DB	2	Chase McBride	Jr
DB	3	Alex Duk	Jr
DB	4	Brandon Dielgat	So
DB	5	Ben Hannula	Fr
DB	9	Kawika Fiddler	So
DB	17	Joe Staab	Fr
LB	20	Paul Kumer	Sr
DB	21	John Brisco	So
DB	22	Adam Burke	Jr
DB	22	Andrew Smythe	Fr
DB	24	Mike Cuevas	Sr
DB	25	Ryan Echer	Fr
DB	26	Mark Johnson	Fr
DB	28	Robert Jones	So
LB	30	Daniel Bierbach	Fr
DB	31	Mike Christensen	Fr
DB	35	Mark Cianciulli	Fr
DB	36	Brandon Resch	Fr
DB	37	Ronnie Pentz	Fr
OLB	39	Greg Nelson	Fr
DB	40	Carlos Correa	Fr
DB	41	Philip Bretsch	Jr
DB	42	Daniel Cornsweet	Fr
LB	43	Elijah Bonde	Sr
LB	44	Jeff Langdon	Sr
LB	46	Kyson Hawkins	So
LB	48	Jordan Johnson	So
DB	49	David Brunner	Fr
LB	50	Tyler Evans	Fr
DL	52	Eric Stern	Fr
LB	53	James Forrester	Fr
DE	54	Daniel Howard	Sr
LB	55	Mac Brown	Fr
DL	56	Cameron Ross	Fr
DB	57	Fred Montgomery	Fr
DL	59	Dustin Ernst	Fr
DL	67	Travis Scudday	Fr
DL	75	Gabe DeAnda	Fr
DL	79	Tareq Abdulghani	Sr
DB	82	Scott Cooper	So
LB	90	Andy Gomez	So
DL	92	Eric Bakhtiari	Fr
DL	94	Chris Penick	Fr
DT	96	Joe Maietta	Sr
DL	97	Ashur Benjamin	Sr
DL	98	Cody Nenadal	Fr
DL	99	Colin Murphy	So

Special teams

Pos.	#	Name	Class
K	25	Jonathan Granger	Fr
K/P	80	John Koker	Jr
K/P	89	Hutch Parker	Fr
K	90	Chris Diaz	Fr

Head coach

- Jim Harbaugh

Coordinators/assistant coaches

- Jack Harbaugh (assistant head coach / running backs)
- Jason DesJarlais (defensive coordinator / safeties)
- Tim Drevno (offensive coordinator / offensive line)
- Matt Hohman (special teams coordinator / defensive line)
- Mike Rish (senior offensive assistant / wide receivers)
- Charles Dimry (secondary)
- Reggie Davis (tight ends)
- Jimmie Dougherty (wide receivers)
- Scott Aurich (defensive assistant)
- Dave Adolph (linebackers)
- Dean Aresco (strength and conditioning coach)
- Hans Straub (assistant strength and conditioning coach)

Legend

- (C) Team captain
- (S) Suspended
- (I) Ineligible
- Injured
- Redshirt

Roster
Last update: January 28, 2025
