= 2004 Harvard Crimson football team =

American college football season

2004 Harvard Crimson football

Ivy League champion
- Conference: Ivy League

Ranking
- Sports Network: No. 13
- Record: 10–0 (7–0 Ivy)
- Head coach: Tim Murphy (11th season)
- Offensive coordinator: Dave Cecchini (2nd season)
- Offensive scheme: Spread
- Defensive coordinator: Kevin Doherty (3rd season)
- Base defense: 3–4
- Home stadium: Harvard Stadium

2004 Ivy League football standings
| | Conf. | | | Overall |
| Team | W | | L | W | | L |
|---|---|---|---|---|---|---|
| No. 13 Harvard $ | 7 | – | 0 | 10 | – | 0 |
| No. 21 Penn | 6 | – | 1 | 8 | – | 2 |
| Cornell | 4 | – | 3 | 4 | – | 6 |
| Brown | 3 | – | 4 | 6 | – | 4 |
| Princeton | 3 | – | 4 | 5 | – | 5 |
| Yale | 3 | – | 4 | 5 | – | 5 |
| Dartmouth | 1 | – | 6 | 1 | – | 9 |
| Columbia | 1 | – | 6 | 1 | – | 9 |
$ – Conference champion; Rankings from The Sports Network poll

The 2004 Harvard Crimson football team represented Harvard University in the 2004 NCAA Division I-AA football season. Harvard finished the season with an overall record of 10–0, winning the Ivy league championship with a conference mark of 7–0.

== Schedule ==
| Date | Time | Opponent | Rank | Site | TV | Result | Attendance | Source |
|---|---|---|---|---|---|---|---|---|
| September 18 | 12:30 p.m. | Holy Cross* | | Harvard Stadium; Boston, MA | | W 35–0 | 9,513 | |
| September 25 | 12:00 p.m. | at Brown | | Brown Stadium; Providence, RI | | W 35–34 | 9,278 | |
| October 2 | 1:00 p.m. | at Lafayette* | | Fisher Field; Easton, PA | LSN | W 38–23 | 5,365 | |
| October 9 | 12:30 p.m. | Cornell | | Harvard Stadium; Boston, MA | | W 34–24 | 13,334 | |
| October 16 | 12:30 p.m. | No. 19 Northeastern* | | Harvard Stadium; Boston, MA | | W 24–17 | 11,809 | |
| October 23 | 1:00 p.m. | at Princeton | No. 22 | Princeton Stadium; Princeton, NJ (rivalry) | | W 39–14 | 14,304 | |
| October 30 | 12:30 p.m. | at Dartmouth | No. 21 | Memorial Field; Hanover, NH (rivalry) | | W 13–12 | 6,030 | |
| November 6 | 12:00 p.m. | Columbia | No. 16 | Harvard Stadium; Boston, MA | | W 38–0 | 10,046 | |
| November 13 | 1:00 p.m. | at No. 17 Penn | No. 15 | Franklin Field; Philadelphia, PA (rivalry) | CN8 | W 31–10 | 15,123 | |
| November 20 | 12:30 p.m. | Yale | No. 13 | Harvard Stadium; Boston, MA (The Game) | | W 35–3 | 30,308 | |
*Non-conference game; Rankings from The Sports Network Poll released prior to the game; All times are in Eastern time

== Rankings ==
Ranking movements Legend: ██ Increase in ranking ██ Decrease in ranking — = Not ranked ( ) = First-place votes
| | Week | | | | | | | | | | | | | |
| Poll | Pre | 1 | 2 | 3 | 4 | 5 | 6 | 7 | 8 | 9 | 10 | 11 | 12 | Final |
|---|---|---|---|---|---|---|---|---|---|---|---|---|---|---|
| The Sports Network | — | — | — | — | — | — | — | 22 | 21 | 16 | 15 | 13 (1) | 12 (2) | 13 |

== Game summaries ==
=== Holy Cross ===
| | 1 | 2 | 3 | 4 | Total |
|---|---|---|---|---|---|
| Crusaders | 0 | 0 | 0 | 0 | 0 |
| Crimson | 7 | 22 | 6 | 0 | 35 |

| Statistics | HC | HARV |
|---|---|---|
| First downs | 9 | 17 |
| Total yards | 131 | 325 |
| Rushing yards | 61 | 246 |
| Passing yards | 70 | 79 |
| Turnovers | 5 | 0 |
| Time of possession | 25:15 | 34:45 |

| Team | Category | Player | Statistics |
|---|---|---|---|
| Holy Cross | Passing | John O'Neil | 10/26, 70 yards, 2 INT |
| Holy Cross | Rushing | Steven Silva | 5 rushes, 31 yards |
| Holy Cross | Receiving | Brian Gavin | 3 reception, 19 yards |
| Harvard | Passing | Ryan Fitzpatrick | 7/15, 79 yards |
| Harvard | Rushing | Clifton Dawson | 21 rushes, 184 yards, 3 TD |
| Harvard | Receiving | Brian Edwards | 3 receptions, 28 yards |

=== At Brown ===
| | 1 | 2 | 3 | 4 | Total |
|---|---|---|---|---|---|
| Crimson | 3 | 7 | 18 | 7 | 35 |
| Bears | 21 | 10 | 0 | 3 | 34 |

| Statistics | HARV | BRWN |
|---|---|---|
| First downs | 19 | 25 |
| Total yards | 447 | 563 |
| Rushing yards | 184 | 250 |
| Passing yards | 263 | 313 |
| Turnovers | 1 | 1 |
| Time of possession | 27:03 | 31:08 |

| Team | Category | Player | Statistics |
|---|---|---|---|
| Harvard | Passing | Ryan Fitzpatrick | 18/25, 263 yards, TD |
| Harvard | Rushing | Clifton Dawson | 23 rushes, 142 yards, 3 TD |
| Harvard | Receiving | Corey Mazza | 9 receptions, 140 yards, TD |
| Brown | Passing | Joe DiGiacomo | 18/33, 313 yards, TD |
| Brown | Rushing | Nick Hartigan | 34 rushes, 175 yards, 2 TD |
| Brown | Receiving | Jarret Schreck | 10 receptions, 253 yards, TD |

=== At Lafayette ===
| | 1 | 2 | 3 | 4 | Total |
|---|---|---|---|---|---|
| Crimson | 6 | 15 | 7 | 10 | 38 |
| Leopards | 7 | 3 | 7 | 6 | 23 |

=== Cornell ===
| | 1 | 2 | 3 | 4 | Total |
|---|---|---|---|---|---|
| Big Red | 0 | 14 | 10 | 0 | 24 |
| Crimson | 6 | 15 | 6 | 7 | 34 |

| Statistics | COR | HARV |
|---|---|---|
| First downs | 15 | 22 |
| Total yards | 412 | 495 |
| Rushing yards | 127 | 160 |
| Passing yards | 285 | 335 |
| Turnovers | 0 | 2 |
| Time of possession | 31:31 | 28:29 |

| Team | Category | Player | Statistics |
|---|---|---|---|
| Cornell | Passing | D. J. Busch | 16/38, 285 yards, TD |
| Cornell | Rushing | Andre Hardaway | 28 rushes, 130 yards, 2 TD |
| Cornell | Receiving | Chad Nice | 4 receptions, 122 yards, TD |
| Harvard | Passing | Ryan Fitzpatrick | 19/35, 317 yards, 2 TD, INT |
| Harvard | Rushing | Ryan Fitzpatrick | 17 rushes, 102 yards, TD |
| Harvard | Receiving | Corey Mazza | 9 receptions, 194 yards, 2 TD |

=== No. 19 Northeastern ===
| | 1 | 2 | 3 | 4 | Total |
|---|---|---|---|---|---|
| No. 19 Huskies | 7 | 7 | 0 | 0 | 14 |
| Crimson | 7 | 17 | 14 | 3 | 41 |

=== At Princeton ===
| | 1 | 2 | 3 | 4 | Total |
|---|---|---|---|---|---|
| No. 22 Crimson | 3 | 19 | 0 | 17 | 39 |
| Tigers | 14 | 0 | 0 | 0 | 14 |

| Statistics | HARV | PRIN |
|---|---|---|
| First downs | 22 | 18 |
| Total yards | 416 | 204 |
| Rushing yards | 244 | 85 |
| Passing yards | 172 | 119 |
| Turnovers | 3 | 3 |
| Time of possession | 31:22 | 28:38 |

| Team | Category | Player | Statistics |
|---|---|---|---|
| Harvard | Passing | Ryan Fitzpatrick | 14/31, 172 yards, TD, INT |
| Harvard | Rushing | Clifton Dawson | 31 rushes, 201 yards, 3 TD |
| Harvard | Receiving | Brian Edwards | 9 receptions, 129 yards |
| Princeton | Passing | Matt Verbit | 12/24, 119 yards, TD, 2 INT |
| Princeton | Rushing | Jon Veach | 15 rushes, 69 yards |
| Princeton | Receiving | Greg Fields | 3 receptions, 27 yards |

=== At Dartmouth ===
| | 1 | 2 | 3 | 4 | Total |
|---|---|---|---|---|---|
| No. 21 Crimson | 0 | 10 | 0 | 3 | 13 |
| Big Green | 0 | 0 | 6 | 6 | 12 |

=== Columbia ===
| | 1 | 2 | 3 | 4 | Total |
|---|---|---|---|---|---|
| Lions | 0 | 0 | 0 | 0 | 0 |
| No. 16 Crimson | 14 | 7 | 17 | 0 | 38 |

=== At No. 17 Penn ===
| | 1 | 2 | 3 | 4 | Total |
|---|---|---|---|---|---|
| No. 15 Crimson | 7 | 7 | 17 | 0 | 31 |
| No. 17 Quakers | 3 | 0 | 7 | 0 | 10 |

| Statistics | HARV | PENN |
|---|---|---|
| First downs | 23 | 18 |
| Total yards | 447 | 263 |
| Rushing yards | 243 | 68 |
| Passing yards | 204 | 195 |
| Turnovers | 2 | 3 |
| Time of possession | 34:07 | 25:53 |

| Team | Category | Player | Statistics |
|---|---|---|---|
| Harvard | Passing | Ryan Fitzpatrick | 13/26, 186 yards, 2 TD, INT |
| Harvard | Rushing | Clifton Dawson | 33 rushes, 160 yards, TD |
| Harvard | Receiving | Brian Edwards | 4 receptions, 66 yards, TD |
| Penn | Passing | Bryan Walker | 18/30, 178 yards, TD, INT |
| Penn | Rushing | Sam Matthews | 21 rushes, 57 yards |
| Penn | Receiving | Dan Castles | 6 receptions, 62 yards, TD |

=== Yale ===
| | 1 | 2 | 3 | 4 | Total |
|---|---|---|---|---|---|
| Bulldogs | 0 | 3 | 0 | 0 | 3 |
| No. 13 Crimson | 7 | 14 | 14 | 0 | 35 |

== Roster ==
2004 Harvard Crimson football team roster
Players
Coaches
Offense

| Pos. | # | Name | Class |
|---|---|---|---|
| QB | 2 | Liam O'Hagan | Fr |
| WR | 4 | Corey Waller | Jr |
| QB | 7 | Garret Schires | Sr |
| WR | 11 | Danny Brown | So |
| WR | 12 | Todd LaFountaine | Jr |
| QB | 13 | Peter Wood | So |
| QB | 14 | Ryan Fitzpatrick | Sr |
| QB | 16 | Mike Jones | So |
| QB | 19 | Chris Pizzotti | Fr |
| RB | 29 | James Velissaris | So |
| RB | 30 | Charles Baakel | Fr |
| RB | 32 | Noah Van Neil | Fr |
| TB | 33 | Clifton Dawson | So |
| RB | 36 | Nick Carrington | Sr |
| WR | 38 | Peter Scully | Jr |
| FB | 42 | Will Bailey | Fr |
| WR | 42 | Ryan Tyler | Jr |
| FB | 44 | Kelly Widman | Jr |
| C | 54 | Andy Smith | Sr |
| OL | 56 | John Bechdol | Sr |
| OL | 57 | Will Johnson | Jr |
| G | 58 | Adam Kulczycky | Jr |
| OL | 62 | Beamer Eisele | Fr |
| OL | 63 | Dustin Stevens | Sr |
| OL | 65 | Tom Rodger | Fr |
| OT | 67 | Frank Fernandez | So |
| OL | 68 | David Paine | Fr |
| OL | 70 | Jon Medley | So |
| OT | 71 | Max McKibben | Sr |
| OT | 72 | Andrew Brecher | So |
| OT | 73 | Mike Frey | Sr |
| OT | 75 | Ryan Browne | So |
| OT | 76 | Nik Sobic | Jr |
| OT | 77 | Bennett Kowalk | Jr |
| OT | 78 | Brian Lapham | Sr |
| OT | 79 | Joe Kawczenski | Sr |
| WR | 80 | B. J. Merriweather | Fr |
| WR | 82 | Brian Edwards | Sr |
| WR | 83 | Corey Mazza | So |
| WR | 84 | Ryan Darnell | Fr |
| TE | 84 | Dan Lane | So |
| WR | 87 | Clayton Gibson | So |
| TE | 88 | Mark Higgins | So |
| WR | 89 | Matt Lagace | Fr |
| TE | 98 | Adam Jenkins | Sr |

Defense

| Pos. | # | Name | Class |
|---|---|---|---|
| DB | 5 | Keith Howell | Jr |
| LB | 6 | Dylan McCrory | So |
| DB | 8 | Gary Sonkur | Sr |
| DB | 9 | James Harvey | Sr |
| S | 10 | Brian Niemczak | Sr |
| DB | 18 | Joe Murt | Fr |
| DB | 19 | Daniel Turner | Fr |
| DB | 20 | Ricky Williamson | Sr |
| DB | 21 | John Scott | Jr |
| DB | 22 | Mike Finch | Fr |
| LB | 23 | Doug Hewlett | Fr |
| DB | 24 | Sean Tracy | Sr |
| DB | 25 | Steven Williams | Fr |
| LB | 26 | Robert Balkema | Jr |
| LB | 27 | Joaquin Sanchez | Jr |
| DB | 28 | Tep Royster | Fr |
| LB | 28 | Neil Sherlock | So |
| DB | 31 | Keegan Toci | So |
| DB | 34 | John Hopkins | Fr |
| LB | 35 | Adam Miller | So |
| S | 37 | Ryan Tully | So |
| FS | 39 | Russel Schober | Fr |
| LB | 40 | Matt Thomas | Jr |
| LB | 43 | Bobby Everett | Sr |
| LB | 45 | Mike Lucas | Jr |
| LB | 46 | Alex Lewis | Fr |
| LB | 47 | Gary Garcia | Jr |
| DB | 48 | Geof LeBus | Jr |
| DT | 49 | Coesen Ngweun | Sr |
| DE | 51 | Michael Plumlee | Fr |
| DT | 52 | Eric Kester | Fr |
| DT | 53 | Wainwright Wint | Jr |
| DT | 55 | Luke Lippai | Jr |
| DE | 59 | Sam Workman | So |
| DT | 60 | David Kunst | So |
| DT | 60 | Dave McDonald | Fr |
| DT | 61 | Matt Drazba | Fr |
| DT | 64 | Felipe Heiderich | Fr |
| DT | 66 | Matt McBurney | Sr |
| OLB | 71 | Alex Obrecht | Fr |
| DE | 81 | Brad Bagdis | Fr |
| DE | 90 | Desmond Bryant | Fr |
| DE | 91 | Matt Farbotko | So |
| DE | 92 | Jason O'Neill | Jr |
| DE | 93 | Doug Bennett | Sr |
| DE | 94 | Grant Jacobs | Jr |
| DE | 95 | Erik Lawler | Fr |
| DT | 96 | Michael Berg | So |
| DE | 97 | Erik Grimm | Jr |

Special teams

| Pos. | # | Name | Class |
|---|---|---|---|
| K, P | 1 | Matt Schindel | Fr |
| P | 15 | Clem McDavid | So |
| P | 17 | Mike King | Jr |

Head coach

- Tim Murphy

Coordinators/assistant coaches

- Dave Cecchini
  Offensive coordinator/Quarterbacks/Wide receivers
- Kevin Doherty
  Defensive coordinator/Associate head coach

Legend

- (C) Team captain
- (S) Suspended
- (I) Ineligible
- Injured
- Redshirt

Roster
Last update: January 11, 2024
