= 2004 Yale Bulldogs football team =

American college football season

2004 Yale Bulldogs football
- Conference: Ivy League
- Record: 5–5 (3–4 Ivy)
- Head coach: Jack Siedlecki (8th season)
- Offensive scheme: Pro-style
- Base defense: 4–3
- Home stadium: Yale Bowl

2004 Ivy League football standings
	Conf.			Overall
Team	W		L	W		L
No. 13 Harvard $	7	–	0	10	–	0
No. 21 Penn	6	–	1	8	–	2
Cornell	4	–	3	4	–	6
Brown	3	–	4	6	–	4
Princeton	3	–	4	5	–	5
Yale	3	–	4	5	–	5
Dartmouth	1	–	6	1	–	9
Columbia	1	–	6	1	–	9
$ – Conference champion; Rankings from The Sports Network poll

The 2004 Yale Bulldogs football team represented Yale University in the 2004 NCAA Division I-AA football season. The Bulldogs were led by eighth-year head coach Jack Siedlecki, played their home games at the Yale Bowl and finished tied for fourth in the Ivy League with a 3–4 record, 5–5 overall.

== Schedule ==
Date	Opponent	Site	Result	Attendance	Source
September 18	at Dayton*	Welcome Stadium; Dayton, OH	W 24–17	6,178	
September 25	at Cornell	Schoellkopf Field; Ithaca, NY	L 7–19	11,853	
October 2	No. 11 Colgate*	Yale Bowl; New Haven, CT	W 31–28	17,089	
October 9	at Dartmouth	Memorial Field; Hanover, NH	W 24–14	6,109	
October 16	No. 18 Lehigh*	Yale Bowl; New Haven, CT	L 24–30	13,123	
October 23	No. 21 Penn	Yale Bowl; New Haven, CT	L 7–17	17,737	
October 30	Columbia	Yale Bowl; New Haven, CT	W 21–14	6,141	
November 6	at Brown	Brown Stadium; Providence, RI	L 17–24	6,212	
November 13	Princeton	Yale Bowl; New Haven, CT (rivalry)	W 21–9	15,296	
November 20	at No. 13 Harvard	Harvard Stadium; Boston, MA (The Game)	L 3–35	30,308	
*Non-conference game; Rankings from The Sports Network Poll released prior to the game

== Personnel ==
2004 Yale Bulldogs football team roster
Players
Coaches
Offense

Pos.	#	Name	Class
TE	1	Alex Faherty	Sr
QB	6	Josh Rodarmel	So
WR	8	Chandler Henley	Jr
QB	9	Jeff Mroz	Sr
QB	10	Alvin Cowan	Sr
RB	11	Andrew Burke	Jr
TE	13	Ted Stem	Sr
QB	18	Todd Feiereisen	Jr
RB	20	Jordan Spence	So
WR	21	Ralph Plumb	Sr
RB	22	Robert Carr	Sr
RB	23	Brandon Rosenblatt	Fr
WR	24	Chris Denny-Brown	So
RB	27	Matt Cautero	Jr
WR	28	Mike McDaniel	Sr
WR	30	Ashley Wright	So
RB	31	David Knox	Jr
WR	32	Rob Wills	Sr
TE	34	Pat Skahan	Jr
FB	39	Taylor Craig	So
RB	42	Tyson Crawford	Sr
RB	46	Drew Palin	Jr
WR	48	D. J. Shooter	So

Defense

Pos.	#	Name	Class
DB	2	Fred Jelks	Sr
DB	3	Barton Simmons	Sr
DB	4	Chris Wright	So
LB	5	Ben Breunig	Sr
LB	7	Kenneth Estrera	Sr
DB	12	Ryan King	Sr
DE	14	Don Smith	Sr
DB	15	Matthew Baker	Jr
DB	16	Andrew Butler	Jr
CB	17	James Beck	Sr
DB	19	Tyler Wells	Jr
DB	25	Mike Holben	Jr
DE	26	Nate Thorne	Sr
DB	33	Mark Larson	So
LB	35	Adam Brown	Sr
LB	36	Cole Harris	Sr
DB	38	Matt Handlon	Jr
DE	40	David Silberstein	Fr
LB	41	Chris McClowry	So
DB	43	Nick Solakian	So
DE	44	Brandon Dyches	Jr
DL	45	Andrew Ralph	Jr
DL	47	Jonas Maciunas	Jr
DE	49	Stan Malyszka	So

Special teams

Pos.	#	Name	Class
K, P	29	Brian Christiansen	Sr
P	30	Ashley Wright	So
P	37	Ryan Allen	Sr
K	85	Andrew Sullivan	Sr
K, P		Alan Kimball	Fr

Head coach

- Jack Siedlecki

Coordinators/assistant coaches

- Tony Reno
  Defensive backs

Legend

- (C) Team captain
- (S) Suspended
- (I) Ineligible
- Injured
- Redshirt

Roster
Last update: June 27, 2024

== Game summaries ==
=== At Dayton ===
	1	2	3	4	Total
Bulldogs	7	3	7	7	24
Flyers	7	7	3	0	17

=== At No. 13 Harvard ===
	1	2	3	4	Total
Bulldogs	0	3	0	0	3
No. 13 Crimson	7	14	14	0	35
