= Tony Reno (American football) =

American football player and coach (1974–2026)

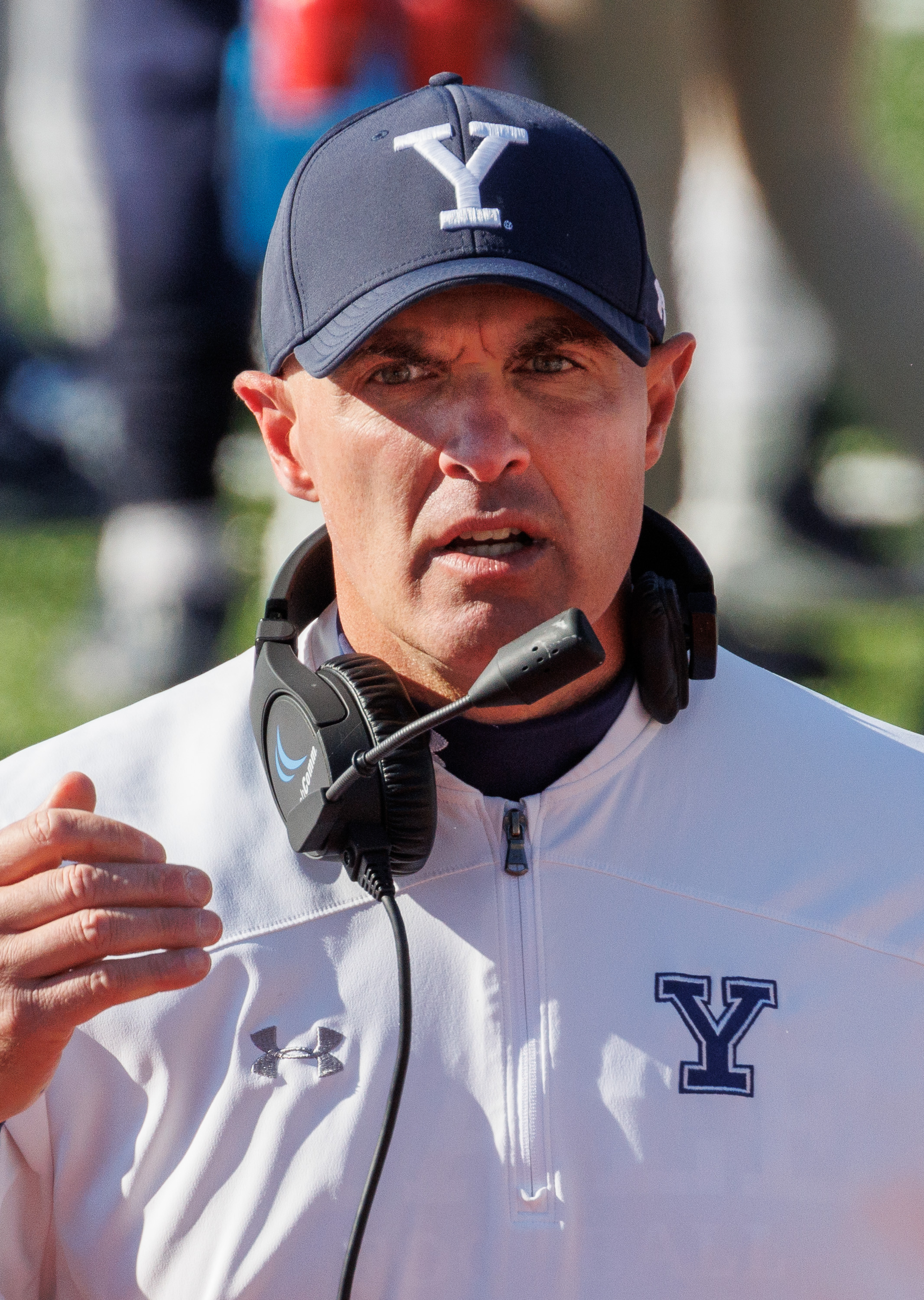
- Reno in 2021

Biographical details
- Born: February 9, 1974; Oxford, Massachusetts, U.S.
- Died: October 2, 2026 (aged 52); Sturbridge, Massachusetts, U.S.

Playing career
- 1993–1996: Worcester State
- Position: Free safety

Coaching career (HC unless noted)
- 1997: King's (PA) (def. assistant)
- 1998–2002: Worcester State (DC)
- 2003: Yale (WR)
- 2004–2008: Yale (DB)
- 2009–2011: Harvard (ST/DB)
- 2012–2025: Yale

Head coaching record
- Overall: 83–49
- Tournaments: 1–1 (NCAA D-I Playoffs)

Accomplishments and honors

Championships
- 5 Ivy (2017, 2019, 2022, 2023, 2025)

Awards
- Ivy League Coach/Coaching Staff of the Year (2022, 2025)

Anthony Paul Reno (February 9, 1974 – October 2, 2026) was an American college football coach. He was the head football coach at Yale University from 2012 to 2025 before stepping down due to health concerns.

== Early life and education ==
A native of Oxford, Massachusetts, Reno graduated from Oxford High School in 1992. Later that year, he enrolled at Hobart and William Smith Colleges in Geneva, New York, but soon transferred to Worcester State College in his home state of Massachusetts. Reno played football at the free safety position for the Worcester State Lancers until 1996, under Brien Cullen. Reno graduated a year later in 1997. He would return to the school and complete a Master of Education in health education in 2000.

== Coaching career ==
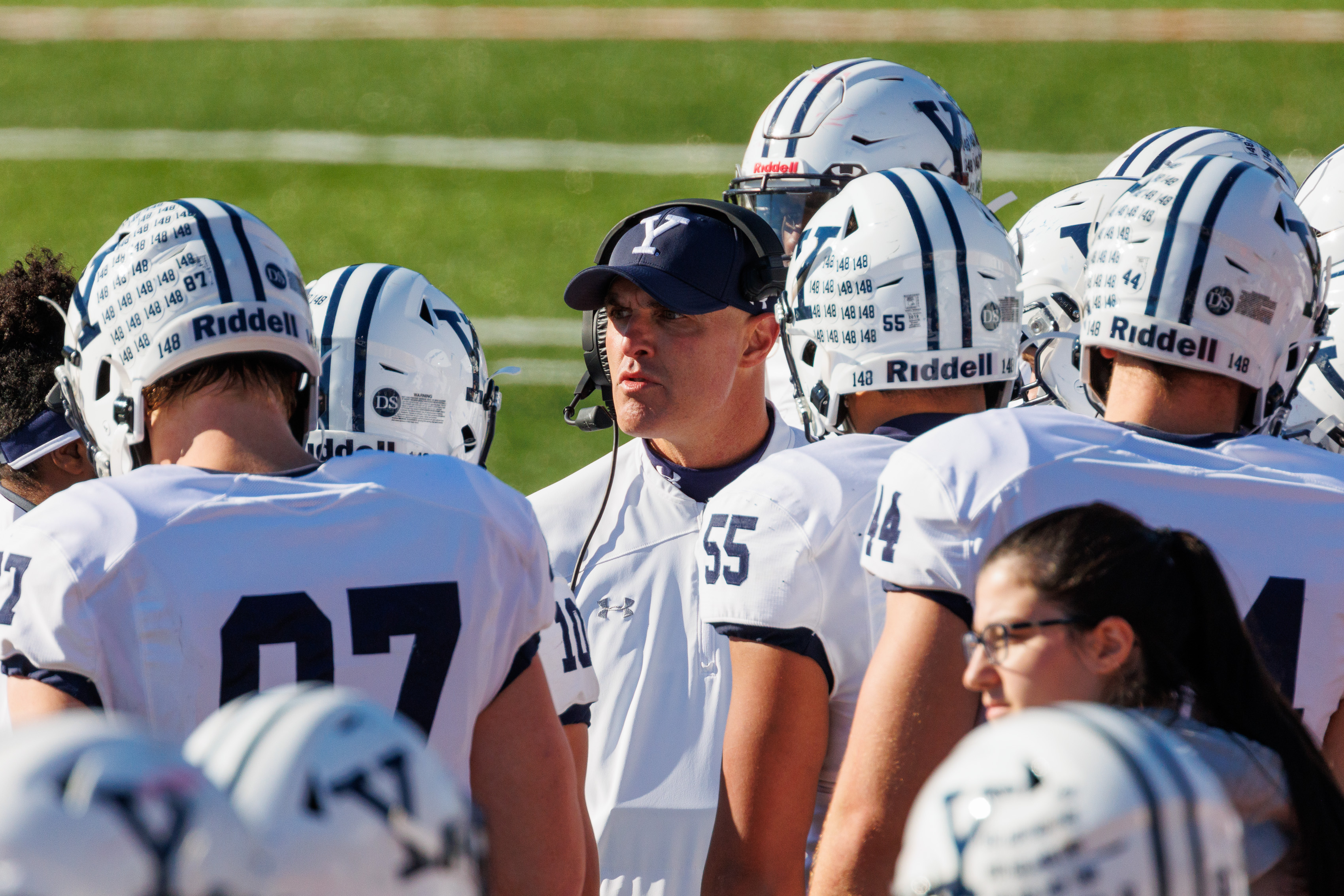
Reno confers with players during the 2021 game against Brown.

Upon graduating from Worcester State, Reno began his coaching career as a defensive assistant, under Richard Mannello, for the King's College Monarchs in Pennsylvania. During that 1997 season, The Monarchs finished fourth in the MAC Freedom Conference with a losing 3–7 record.

A year later, in 1998, Reno returned to the Worcester State Lancers as a defensive coordinator under his former coach, Cullen. Reno remained there until 2002. While his first two years at Worcester State saw losing records, the last three were very successful, and resulted in winning the Eastern College Athletic Conference Northeast Bowl in 2001.

Reno's success with the Lancers opened the opportunity as a wide receivers coach, under Jack Siedlecki, for the Yale Bulldogs in 2003. Reno was shuffled to be the defensive backs coach a year later, a post which he held until 2008. The Bulldogs mostly hovered around a .500 win percentage during his time at Yale; however, the 2006 season resulted in the team being named co-Ivy League champions, along with the Princeton Tigers.

In 2009, Reno transferred within the Ivy League to work for the Harvard Crimson as a special teams and defensive backs coach under Tim Murphy. The Crimson maintained a winning record throughout Reno's time there, and won the Ivy League in his final season in 2011.

On January 12, 2012, Reno was hired as the Joel E. Smilow '54 Head Coach of Football for the Yale Bulldogs. He replaced Tom Williams and became the 34th head coach in the school's history. Notably, Reno also became the first native of Massachusetts since Ted Coy in 1910 to coach the Bulldogs. The team won five Ivy League championships under the leadership of Reno (2017, 2019, 2022, 2023, 2025), second most in Yale history behind Carm Cozza.

In 2014, Reno was among the finalists for the Eddie Robinson Award, along with his former colleague, Murphy. The award ultimately went to Sean McDonnell of the New Hampshire Wildcats.

At the end of the 2025 season, Reno was under medical leave while he was being treated for a "rare" undisclosed illness. He resigned as coach due to health reasons in February 2026 after being diagnosed with Creutzfeldt‑Jakob disease.

== Personal life and death ==
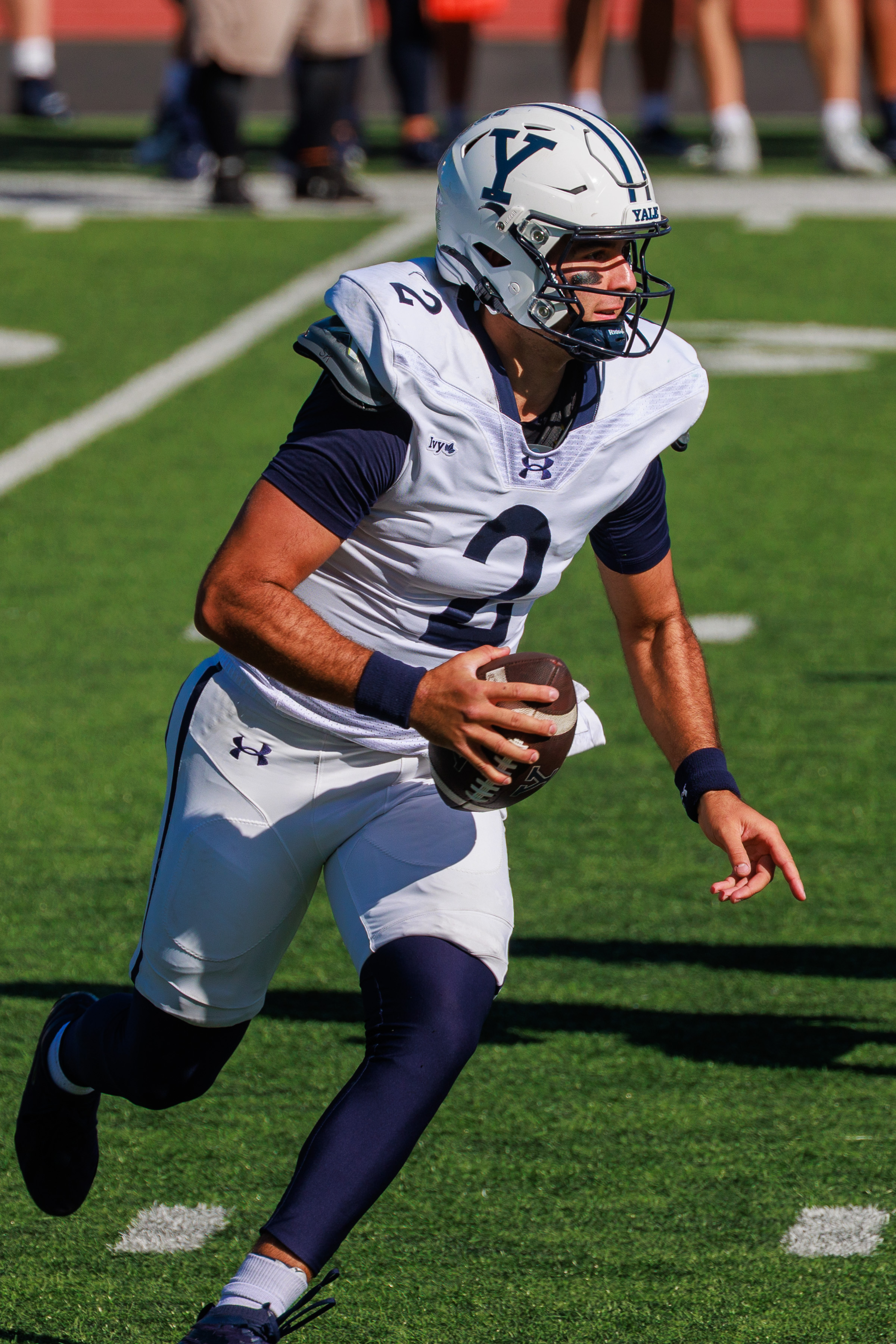
Yale quarterback Dante Reno

Reno was married to Toni, with whom he had two sons, Dante and Vince, and one daughter, Angelina. As of 2025, Dante is Yale's starting quarterback. The family resides in Sturbridge, Massachusetts, as well as near New Haven, Connecticut.

Reno died from complications of Creutzfeldt–Jakob disease on October 2, 2026, at the age of 52.

== Head coaching record ==
Year	Team	Overall	Conference	Standing	Bowl/playoffs	STATS^{#}	Coaches^{°}
Yale Bulldogs (Ivy League) (2012–present)
2012	Yale	2–8	1–6	8th			
2013	Yale	5–5	3–4	T–4th			
2014	Yale	8–2	5–2	3rd			
2015	Yale	6–4	3–4	T–4th			
2016	Yale	3–7	3–4	T–4th			
2017	Yale	9–1	6–1	1st		24	24
2018	Yale	5–5	3–4	T–4th			
2019	Yale	9–1	6–1	T–1st		25	24
2020–21	No team—COVID-19						
2021	Yale	5–5	4–3	T–4th			
2022	Yale	8–2	6–1	1st			
2023	Yale	7–3	5–2	T–1st			
2024	Yale	7–3	4–3	4th			
2025	Yale	9–3	6–1	T–1st	L NCAA Division I Second Round	15	13
Yale:		83–49	55–36				
Total:		83–49					
National championship Conference title Conference division title or championship game berth
