= 2004 Holy Cross Crusaders football team =

American college football season

2004 Holy Cross Crusaders football
- Conference: Patriot League
- Record: 3–8 (1–5 Patriot)
- Head coach: Tom Gilmore (1st season)
- Offensive coordinator: Chris Pincince (1st season)
- Defensive coordinator: Isaac Collins (1st season)
- Captains: David Mitchell; Steve Silva
- Home stadium: Fitton Field

2004 Patriot League football standings
	Conf.			Overall
Team	W		L	W		L
No. 15 Lehigh +^	5	–	1	9	–	3
No. 19 Lafayette +^	5	–	1	8	–	4
Bucknell	4	–	2	7	–	4
Colgate	4	–	2	7	–	4
Fordham	2	–	4	5	–	6
Holy Cross	1	–	5	3	–	8
Georgetown	0	–	6	3	–	8
+ – Conference co-champions; ^ – NCAA Division I-AA playoff participant; Rankings from The Sports Network poll

The 2004 Holy Cross Crusaders football team was an American football team that represented the College of the Holy Cross during the 2004 NCAA Division I-AA football season. Holy Cross finished second-to-last in the Patriot League.

In their first year under head coach Tom Gilmore, the Crusaders compiled a 3–8 record. David Mitchell and Steve Silva were the team captains.

The Crusaders were outscored 367 to 240. Their 1–5 conference record placed sixth in the seven-team Patriot League standings.

Holy Cross played its home games at Fitton Field on the college campus in Worcester, Massachusetts.

== Schedule ==
Date	Opponent	Site	Result	Attendance	Source
September 4	Duquesne*	Fitton Field; Worcester, MA	L 7–31	6,478	
September 11	San Diego*	Fitton Field; Worcester, MA	L 31–37	5,471	
September 18	at Harvard*	Harvard Stadium; Boston, MA	L 0–35	9,513	
October 2	Fordham	Fitton Field; Worcester, MA (rivalry)	L 35–42	5,222	
October 9	No. 17 Lehigh^{†}	Fitton Field; Worcester, MA	L 14–42	6,826	
October 16	at Dartmouth*	Memorial Field; Hanover, NH	W 24–0	3,116	
October 23	at No. 18 Colgate	Andy Kerr Stadium; Hamilton, NY	L 7–41	9,228	
October 30	Bucknell^	Fitton Field; Worcester, MA	L 27–42	4,091	
November 6	Marist*	Fitton Field; Worcester, MA	W 44–13	4,872	
November 13	at Lafayette	Fisher Field; Easton, PA	L 20–56	4,543	
November 20	at Georgetown	Harbin Field; Washington, DC	W 31–28 ^{OT}	1,870	
*Non-conference game; ^{†}Homecoming; ^ Family Weekend; Rankings from The Sports Network Poll released prior to the game
