= 2004 Cornell Big Red football team =

American college football season

2004 Cornell Big Red football
- Conference: Ivy League
- Record: 4–6 (4–3 Ivy)
- Head coach: Jim Knowles (1st season)
- Offensive coordinator: Tim Rogers (1st season)
- Offensive scheme: Multiple
- Defensive coordinator: Clayton Carlin (1st season)
- Base defense: 4–3
- Captains: David Archer; Brad Kitlowski; Ryan Lempa
- Home stadium: Schoellkopf Field

2004 Ivy League football standings
	Conf.			Overall
Team	W		L	W		L
No. 13 Harvard $	7	–	0	10	–	0
No. 21 Penn	6	–	1	8	–	2
Cornell	4	–	3	4	–	6
Brown	3	–	4	6	–	4
Princeton	3	–	4	5	–	5
Yale	3	–	4	5	–	5
Dartmouth	1	–	6	1	–	9
Columbia	1	–	6	1	–	9
$ – Conference champion; Rankings from The Sports Network poll

The 2004 Cornell Big Red football team represented Cornell University in the 2004 NCAA Division I-AA football season as a member of the Ivy League. They were led by first-year head coach Jim Knowles and played their home games at Schoellkopf Field. Cornell finished the season 4–6 overall and 4–3 in Ivy League play.

== Schedule ==
Date	Time	Opponent	Site	Result	Attendance	Source
September 18	7:00 p.m.	at Bucknell*	Christy Mathewson–Memorial Stadium; Lewisburg, PA	L 9–15	6,702	
September 25	1:00 p.m.	Yale	Schoellkopf Field; Ithaca, NY	W 19–7	11,835	
October 2	1:00 p.m.	at Towson*	Johnny Unitas Stadium; Towson, MD	L 11–21	2,522	
October 9	12:30 p.m.	at Harvard	Harvard Stadium; Boston, MA	L 24–34	13,334	
October 16	1:00 p.m.	Colgate*	Schoellkopf Field; Ithaca, NY (rivalry)	L 6–10	12,168	
October 23	1:00 p.m.	at Brown	Brown Stadium; Providence, RI	L 17–21	9,310	
October 30	12:00 p.m.	Princeton	Schoellkopf Field; Ithaca, NY	W 21–20	5,842	
November 6	1:00 p.m.	Dartmouth	Schoellkopf Field; Ithaca, NY (rivalry)	W 14–7	5,012	
November 13	12:30 p.m.	at Columbia	Wien Stadium; New York, NY (rivalry)	W 32–26	4,020	
November 20	12:00 p.m.	No. 22 Penn	Schoellkopf Field; Ithaca, NY (rivalry)	L 14–20	4,242	
*Non-conference game; Rankings from The Sports Network Poll released prior to the game; All times are in Eastern time
