= 2004 Georgetown Hoyas football team =

American college football season

2004 Georgetown Hoyas football
- Conference: Patriot League
- Record: 3–8 (0–6 Patriot)
- Head coach: Bob Benson (12th season)
- Offensive coordinator: Elliot Uzelac (1st season)
- Captains: Ryan Goethals; Brandon Small; Frank Terrazzino
- Home stadium: Harbin Field

2004 Patriot League football standings
| | Conf. | | | Overall |
| Team | W | | L | W | | L |
|---|---|---|---|---|---|---|
| No. 15 Lehigh +^ | 5 | – | 1 | 9 | – | 3 |
| No. 19 Lafayette +^ | 5 | – | 1 | 8 | – | 4 |
| Bucknell | 4 | – | 2 | 7 | – | 4 |
| Colgate | 4 | – | 2 | 7 | – | 4 |
| Fordham | 2 | – | 4 | 5 | – | 6 |
| Holy Cross | 1 | – | 5 | 3 | – | 8 |
| Georgetown | 0 | – | 6 | 3 | – | 8 |
+ – Conference co-champions; ^ – NCAA Division I-AA playoff participant; Rankings from The Sports Network poll

The 2004 Georgetown Hoyas football team was an American football team that represented Georgetown University during the 2004 NCAA Division I-AA football season. Georgetown finished last in the Patriot League.

In their 12th year under head coach Bob Benson, the Hoyas compiled a 3–8 record. Ryan Goethals, Brandon Small and Frank Terrazzino were the team captains.

The Hoyas were outscored 280 to 174. Their winless (0–6) conference record was the worst in the seven-team Patriot League standings.

Georgetown played its home games at Harbin Field on the university campus in Washington, D.C.

== Schedule ==
| Date | Time | Opponent | Site | Result | Attendance | Source |
|---|---|---|---|---|---|---|
| September 4 | | Saint Francis (PA)* | Harbin Field; Washington, DC | W 36–7 | 1,671 | |
| September 11 | | Lafayette | Harbin Field; Washington, DC | L 6–17 | 1,842 | |
| September 18 | | at Duquesne* | Rooney Field; Pittsburgh, PA | L 7–45 | 2,022 | |
| September 25 | | at No. 10 Colgate | Andy Kerr Stadium; Hamilton, NY | L 0–33 | | |
| October 2 | | Bucknell | Harbin Field; Washington, DC | L 19–35 | | |
| October 9 | | Virginia Military* | Harbin Field; Washington, DC | W 21–0 | 2,874 | |
| October 23 | | at Monmouth* | Kessler Field; West Long Branch, NJ | L 10–27 | 3,607 | |
| October 30 | | at Fordham | Coffey Field; Bronx, NY | L 6–36 | 3,180 | |
| November 6 | | No. 9 Lehigh | Harbin Field; Washington, DC | L 18–49 | 2,111 | |
| November 13 | 1:00 p.m. | at Davidson* | Richardson Stadium; Davidson, NC | W 23–0 | 2,482 | |
| November 20 | | Holy Cross | Harbin Field; Washington, DC | L 28–31 ^{OT} | 1,870 | |
*Non-conference game; Rankings from The Sports Network Poll released prior to the game; All times are in Eastern time
