= 2004 Lehigh Mountain Hawks football team =

American college football season

2004 Lehigh Mountain Hawks football

Patriot League co-champion
- Conference: Patriot League
- Record: 9–3 (5–1 Patriot)
- Head coach: Pete Lembo (4th season)
- Captains: Kaloma Cardwell; Karrie Ford; Jason Morrell; Justin Terry
- Home stadium: Goodman Stadium

2004 Patriot League football standings
	Conf.			Overall
Team	W		L	W		L
No. 15 Lehigh +^	5	–	1	9	–	3
No. 19 Lafayette +^	5	–	1	8	–	4
Bucknell	4	–	2	7	–	4
Colgate	4	–	2	7	–	4
Fordham	2	–	4	5	–	6
Holy Cross	1	–	5	3	–	8
Georgetown	0	–	6	3	–	8
+ – Conference co-champions; ^ – NCAA Division I-AA playoff participant; Rankings from The Sports Network poll

The 2004 Lehigh Mountain Hawks football team was an American football team that represented Lehigh University during the 2004 NCAA Division I-AA football season. Lehigh won the Patriot League co-championship but lost in the first round of the national playoffs.

In their fourth year under head coach Pete Lembo, the Mountain Hawks compiled a 9–3 record. Kaloma Cardwell, Karrie Ford, Jason Morrell and Justin Terry were the team captains.

The Mountain Hawks outscored opponents 345 to 193. Their 5–1 conference record tied for best in the Patriot League standings. Though their co-champion Lafayette was awarded the Patriot League's automatic berth in the national Division I-AA playoffs, Lehigh qualified as an at-large selection. Both Patriot League representatives lost their first-round games.

Lehigh was ranked No. 23 in the preseason national Division I-AA poll, and remained ranked throughout the season. The Mountain Hawks' ranking peaked at No. 8 in mid-November, but losses to archrival Lafayette and in the first round of the playoffs dropped them to No. 15 in the postseason poll.

Lehigh played its home games, including its one playoff game, at Goodman Stadium on the university's Goodman Campus in Bethlehem, Pennsylvania.

== Schedule ==
Date	Opponent	Rank	Site	Result	Attendance	Source
September 4	Stony Brook*	No. 23	Goodman Stadium; Bethlehem, PA	W 25–2	7,116	
September 11	No. 8 Villanova*	No. 22	Goodman Stadium; Bethlehem, PA	L 16–22	12,235	
September 18	at Liberty*	No. 24	Williams Stadium; Lynchburg, VA	W 34–16	10,895	
October 2	Albany*	No. 21	Goodman Stadium; Bethlehem, PA	W 44–14	6,874	
October 9	at Holy Cross	No. 17	Fitton Field; Worcester, MA	W 42–14	6,826	
October 16	at Yale*	No. 18	Yale Bowl; New Haven, CT	W 30–24	13,123	
October 23	Bucknell	No. 16	Goodman Stadium; Bethlehem, PA	W 40–17		
October 30	No. 18 Colgate	No. 12	Goodman Stadium; Bethlehem, PA	W 21–14	13,929	
November 6	at Georgetown	No. 9	Harbin Field; Washington, DC	W 49–18	2,111	
November 13	Fordham	No. 8	Goodman Stadium; Bethlehem, PA	W 21–14	6,218	
November 20	at Lafayette	No. 8	Fisher Field; Easton, PA (The Rivalry)	L 10–24		
November 27	No. 8 James Madison*	No. 16	Goodman Stadium; Bethlehem, PA (Div. I-AA playoffs)	L 13–14	6,116	
*Non-conference game; Rankings from The Sports Network Poll released prior to the game
