= 2004 Bucknell Bison football team =

American college football season

2004 Bucknell Bison football
- Conference: Patriot League
- Record: 7–4 (4–2 Patriot)
- Head coach: Tim Landis (2nd season)
- Offensive coordinator: Tim Camp (1st season)
- Defensive coordinator: Tripp Merritt (2nd season)
- Captains: Kevin Ransome; Daris Wilson
- Home stadium: Christy Mathewson–Memorial Stadium

2004 Patriot League football standings
	Conf.			Overall
Team	W		L	W		L
No. 15 Lehigh +^	5	–	1	9	–	3
No. 19 Lafayette +^	5	–	1	8	–	4
Bucknell	4	–	2	7	–	4
Colgate	4	–	2	7	–	4
Fordham	2	–	4	5	–	6
Holy Cross	1	–	5	3	–	8
Georgetown	0	–	6	3	–	8
+ – Conference co-champions; ^ – NCAA Division I-AA playoff participant; Rankings from The Sports Network poll

The 2004 Bucknell Bison football team was an American football team that represented Bucknell University during the 2004 NCAA Division I-AA football season. It tied for third in the Patriot League.

Bucknell played its home games at Christy Mathewson–Memorial Stadium on the university campus in Lewisburg, Pennsylvania.

In its second season under head coach Tim Landis, the Bison compiled a 7–4 record. Kevin Ransome and Daris Wilson were the team captains.

The Bison outscored opponents 296 to 221. Their 4–2 conference record tied for third place in the seven-team Patriot League standings.

== Schedule ==
Date	Opponent	Site	Result	Attendance	Source
September 2	at No. 9 Villanova*	Villanova Stadium; Villanova, PA	L 14–20	9,073	
September 18	Cornell*	Christy Mathewson–Memorial Stadium; Lewisburg, PA	W 15–9	6,702	
September 25	Columbia*	Christy Mathewson–Memorial Stadium; Lewisburg, PA	W 42–13	8,233	
October 2	at Georgetown	Harbin Field; Washington, DC	W 35–19		
October 9	Penn^*	Christy Mathewson–Memorial Stadium; Lewisburg, PA	L 25–32 ^{OT}	10,602	
October 16	Lafayette	Christy Mathewson–Memorial Stadium; Lewisburg, PA	L 13–14		
October 23	at No. 16 Lehigh	Goodman Stadium; Bethlehem, PA	L 17–40		
October 30	at Holy Cross	Fitton Field; Worcester, MA	W 42–27	4,091	
November 6	Fordham^{†}	Christy Mathewson–Memorial Stadium; Lewisburg, PA	W 21–20	5,842	
November 13	No. 22 Colgate	Christy Mathewson–Memorial Stadium; Lewisburg, PA	W 42–7	3,502	
November 20	at Duquesne*	Rooney Field; Pittsburgh, PA	W 30–20	2,120	
*Non-conference game; ^{†}Homecoming; ^ Parents Weekend; Rankings from The Sports Network Poll released prior to the game
