= 2004 Colgate Raiders football team =

American college football season

2004 Colgate Raiders football
- Conference: Patriot League
- Record: 7–4 (4–2 Patriot)
- Head coach: Dick Biddle (9th season)
- Captains: Chris Brown; Luke Graham; Antrell Tyson
- Home stadium: Andy Kerr Stadium

2004 Patriot League football standings
	Conf.			Overall
Team	W		L	W		L
No. 15 Lehigh +^	5	–	1	9	–	3
No. 19 Lafayette +^	5	–	1	8	–	4
Bucknell	4	–	2	7	–	4
Colgate	4	–	2	7	–	4
Fordham	2	–	4	5	–	6
Holy Cross	1	–	5	3	–	8
Georgetown	0	–	6	3	–	8
+ – Conference co-champions; ^ – NCAA Division I-AA playoff participant; Rankings from The Sports Network poll

The 2004 Colgate Raiders football team was an American football team that represented Colgate University during the 2004 NCAA Division I-AA football season. A year after advancing to the national championship, Colgate tied for third in the Patriot League.

In its ninth season under head coach Dick Biddle, the team compiled a 7–4 record. Chris Brown, Luke Graham and Antrell Tyson were the team captains.

The Raiders outscored opponents 261 to 225. Their 4–2 conference record tied for third in the seven-team Patriot League standings.

Following their deep playoff run in 2003, the Raiders were ranked No. 5 in the preseason national Division I-AA poll. Losses quickly dropped Colgate to the bottom half of the top 25, and a league loss to unranked Bucknell in the second-to-last weekend of the season booted the Raiders from the rankings altogether. Colgate finished the year unranked.

The team played its home games at Andy Kerr Stadium in Hamilton, New York.

== Schedule ==
Date	Opponent	Rank	Site	Result	Attendance	Source
September 11	at No. 14 UMass*	No. 4	McGuirk Stadium; Hadley, MA	L 20–30	16,405	
September 18	Dartmouth*	No. 12	Andy Kerr Stadium; Hamilton, NY	W 17–15	5,439	
September 25	Georgetown	No. 10	Andy Kerr Stadium; Hamilton, NY	W 33–0		
October 2	at Yale*	No. 11	Yale Bowl; New Haven, CT	L 28–31	17,089	
October 9	Princeton*	No. 20	Andy Kerr Stadium; Hamilton, NY	W 29–26	7,893	
October 16	at Cornell*	No. 20	Schoellkopf Field; Ithaca, NY (rivalry)	W 10–6	12,168	
October 23	Holy Cross	No. 18	Andy Kerr Stadium; Hamilton, NY	W 41–7	9,228	
October 30	at No. 12 Lehigh	No. 18	Goodman Stadium; Bethlehem, PA	L 14–21	13,929	
November 6	Lafayette	No. 24	Andy Kerr Stadium; Hamilton, NY	W 22–19		
November 13	at Bucknell	No. 22	Christy Mathewson–Memorial Stadium; Lewisburg, PA	L 7–42	3,502	
November 20	at Fordham		Coffey Field; Bronx, NY	W 40–28	2,760	
*Non-conference game; Rankings from The Sports Network Poll released prior to the game
