= 2025 Yale Bulldogs football team =

American college football season

2025 Yale Bulldogs football

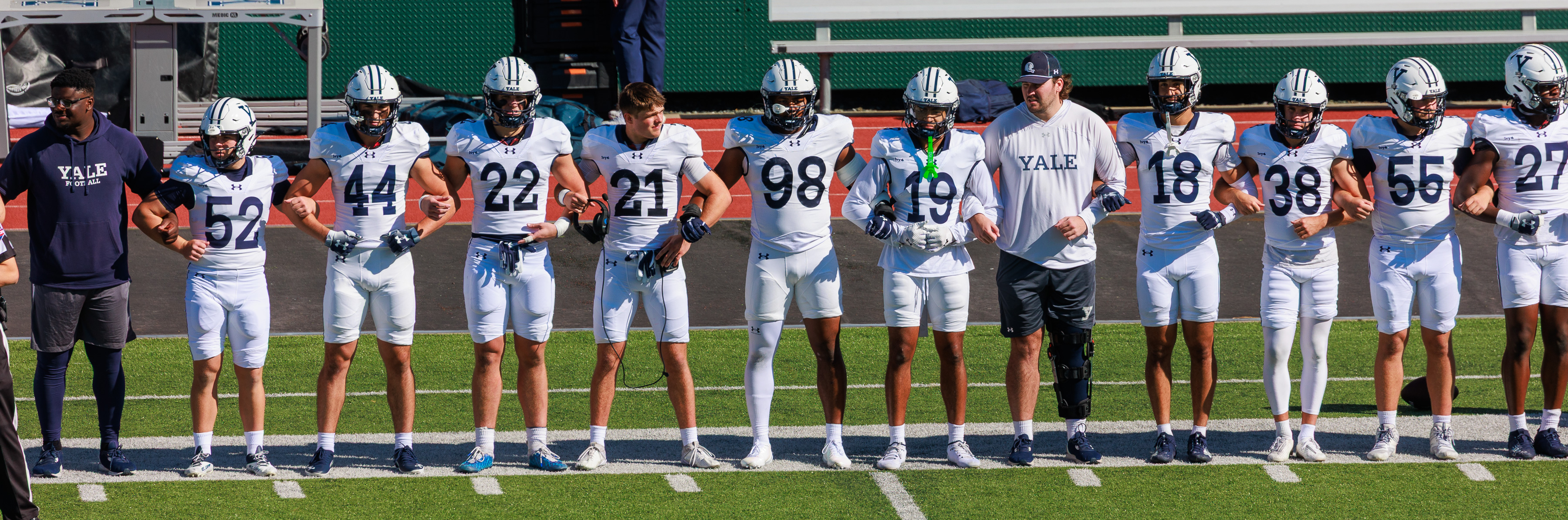
- 2025 Bulldogs at Dartmouth

Ivy League co-champion

NCAA Division I Second Round, L 13–21 vs. Montana State
- Conference: Ivy League

Ranking
- STATS: No. 15
- FCS Coaches: No. 13
- Record: 9–3 (6–1 Ivy)
- Head coach: Tony Reno (13th season)
- Offensive coordinator: Chris Ostrowsky (3rd season)
- Offensive scheme: Pro spread
- Defensive coordinator: Sean McGowan (8th season)
- Co-defensive coordinator: Jay Anderson (3rd season)
- Base defense: 4–2–5
- Captain: Joshua Pitsenberger
- Home stadium: Yale Bowl

2025 Ivy League football standings
	Conf.			Overall
Team	W		L	W		L
No. 15 Yale +^	6	–	1	9	–	3
No. 20 Harvard +^	6	–	1	9	–	2
Dartmouth	4	–	3	7	–	3
Penn	4	–	3	6	–	4
Cornell	3	–	4	4	–	6
Princeton	2	–	5	3	–	7
Brown	2	–	5	5	–	5
Columbia	1	–	6	2	–	8
+ – Conference co-champions; ^ – FCS playoff participant; Rankings from STATS Poll

The 2025 Yale Bulldogs football team represented Yale University as a member of the Ivy League during the 2025 NCAA Division I FCS football season. The Bulldogs were led by Tony Reno in his thirteenth season as head coach.

On December 18, 2024, the Ivy League announced that it would begin participating in the NCAA Division I FCS Playoffs starting with the 2025 season. The Bulldogs received the conference's auto-bid after defeating rival Harvard in the final regular season game to finish as conference co-champions.

On February 17, 2026, Reno announced he would be stepping down as the Bulldogs' head coach due to health concerns. On February 23, Lehigh head coach Kevin Cahill, who served as the Bulldogs' offensive coordinator from 2018 to 2022, was named Reno's successor.

== Preseason ==
=== Preseason poll ===
On August 4, the Ivy League released its preseason prediction poll. The Bulldogs were predicted to finish third in the conference.

== Schedule ==
Date	Time	Opponent	Rank	Site	TV	Result	Attendance
September 20	12:00 p.m.	Holy Cross*		Yale Bowl; New Haven, CT	ESPN+	W 28–10	4,469
September 27	12:00 p.m.	Cornell		Yale Bowl; New Haven, CT	ESPN+	W 41–24	4,467
October 4	12:00 p.m.	at No. 9 Lehigh*		Goodman Stadium; Lower Saucon, PA (Yank Townsend Trophy)	ESPN+	L 13–31	4,364
October 11	1:30 p.m.	at Dartmouth		Memorial Field; Hanover, NH	ESPN+	L 16–17	7,895
October 18	12:00 p.m.	Stonehill*		Yale Bowl; New Haven, CT	ESPN+	W 47–7	4,166
October 25	12:00 p.m.	Penn		Yale Bowl; New Haven, CT	ESPN+	W 35–13	4,412
November 1	12:00 p.m.	Columbia		Yale Bowl; New Haven, CT	ESPN+	W 24–10	4,375
November 8	12:00 p.m.	at Brown		Brown Stadium; Providence, RI	ESPN+	W 34–22	3,009
November 15	12:00 p.m.	at Princeton		Powers Field at Princeton Stadium; Princeton, NJ (rivalry)	ESPN+	W 13–10	4,704
November 22	12:00 p.m.	No. 8 Harvard		Yale Bowl; New Haven, CT (rivalry)	ESPNU	W 45–28	52,497
November 29	12:00 p.m.	at No. 14 Youngstown State*	No. 24	Stambaugh Stadium; Youngstown, OH (NCAA Division I First Round)	ESPN+	W 43–42	4,869
December 6	2:00 p.m.	at No. 2 Montana State*	No. 24	Bobcat Stadium; Bozeman, MT (NCAA Division I Second Round)	ESPN+	L 13–21	20,867
*Non-conference game; Rankings from STATS Poll released prior to the game; All times are in Eastern time; Source:

== Rankings ==
Ranking movements Legend: ██ Increase in ranking ██ Decrease in ranking — = Not ranked RV = Received votes
	Week														
Poll	Pre	1	2	3	4	5	6	7	8	9	10	11	12	13	Final
STATS	—	—	—	—	RV	RV	—	—	—	—	RV	RV	RV	24	15
Coaches'	RV	—	—	—	RV	RV	—	—	—	—	RV	RV	25	21	13

== Roster ==
2025 Yale Bulldogs football team roster
Players
Coaches
Offense

Pos.	#	Name	Class
WR	1	Mason Shipp	Sr
QB	2	Dante Reno	So
QB	3	Marshall Howe	Sr
RB, WR	4	Cameron Price	Sr
RB	5	Cuttler Adams	So
RB	6	Hugo Djeumeni Kemeni	Fr
RB	7	Joshua Pitsenberger	Sr
TE	9	Graham Smith	Jr
WR	10	Kyle Maltarich	So
WR	11	Aidan Stephens	Sr
WR	13	Donovan McKoy	Jr
QB	15	Brogan McCaughey	Sr
WR	16	Garon Kemp	Jr
TE	17	Robby Tattersall	Jr
WR	18	Jaxton Santiago	So
QB	19	Charlie Hewitt	Fr
WR	20	Chase Collyer	Jr
WR	21	Brice June	Jr
TE	22	Brady Wagner	So
WR	23	Nico Brown	Sr
WR	25	Clayton Sobecki	So
WR	27	Kelvin Smith	Sr
RB	28	Wilhelm Daal	Sr
RB	31	Adam Pandolfi	So
TE	44	Spencer Mermans	Jr
OL	50	Declan Savage	Sr
OL	53	John Prokapus	Fr
OL	54	Jackson St. Aubyn	Jr
OL	55	Dylan Garrity	Jr
OL	57	Joseph Nash	Sr
OL	58	Leo Bluhm	Sr
OL	59	Zavier Avera	Jr
OL	62	Jimmy Randazzo	Fr
OL	69	Quinton Lewis	Jr
OL	70	Cameron Charron	Sr
OL	72	Bennett Anderson	So
OT	73	Grayson McGown	Fr
OL	74	Sam Connelly	Fr
OL	75	Michael Bennett	Sr
OL	76	Thomas Hoey	Fr
OT	77	Aderian Adelabu	Fr
OL	78	Charlie Humphreys	So
OL	79	Tru Kendrick	Fr
WR	80	Lucius Anderson	Fr
WR	81	Thomas Bacon Jr.	So
WR	83	Camden Hickox	So
TE	84	Scott Truninger	Sr
TE	85	Colton Sanders	So
WR	86	Davis Wong	So
WR	87	Reid Jones	Fr
TE	88	Hutch Chipman	Fr

Defense

Pos.	#	Name	Class
DB	0	Osize Daniyan	Jr
DL	1	Zairion Jackson-Bass	Jr
DL	2	Ezekiel Larry	Jr
DB	3	Chenna Onwuasoanya	Fr
DB	4	Abu Kamara	Jr
DB	5	Billy Eastep	So
DB	6	Joshua Traver	Sr
DB	7	Brandon Webster	Jr
LB	8	Phoenix Grant	Jr
DB	9	Brandon Banks	So
LB	10	Alex Kraus	Fr
LB	12	Steven Partin	So
LB	13	Lucas Price	Fr
DB	14	Charles Barkley-Smith	So
DB	15	JP Schmidt	So
DB	16	PJ Hartsfield	Fr
DB	18	Da'Quan Gonzales	Sr
DB	19	Dillion Rickenbacker	So
DB	20	Chris White	So
DB	21	Ty Ingram-Eiser	So
DE	23	Xavier Coleman	Fr
LB	24	Inumidin Ayo-Durojaiye	Sr
DB	29	John Kemp	Jr
DL	30	Jack Michalik	Sr
S	32	Cameron Nelson	Fr
DL	33	James Cave	So
LB	34	Joseph Barry	So
S	35	Brady Carson	Fr
DL	37	Jackson Boone	So
LB	41	Melik Williams	Sr
DL	43	Micaiah Shaber	Sr
LB	44	Eddie Palumbo	So
LB	46	Joe McCord	So
DE	47	Jevidi Hutton	Fr
LB	50	Jesse Schutzman	So
DL	51	Ejiroghene Egodogbare	Sr
DL	54	Babawale Fadeyibi	Jr
DL	56	Xavier Rivers	So
DE	90	Max Ruedebusch	Fr
DL	92	Sam McGivern	So
DL	93	Mack Johnson	So
DT	95	Erik Ekens	Fr
DL	96	Jaylin tate	Jr
DL	97	Lota Ugokwe	So
DL	98	Dylan Yang	Sr
DL	99	Cooper Austin	Jr

Special teams

Pos.	#	Name	Class
K, P	26	Nick Conforti	Sr
K, P	36	Noah Piper	Fr
K, P	38	Reese Keeney	So
LS	52	Colby Connell	So
LS	55	Joey Fortner	Jr

Head coach

- Tony Reno

Coordinators/assistant coaches

- Chris Ostrowsky
  Offensive coordinator/Quarterbacks
- Sean McGowan
  Defensive coordinator/Linebackers
- Jay Anderson
  Co-defensive coordinator/Defensive backs
- Steven Vashel
  Special teams coordinator/Outside linebackers
- Stefon Wheeler
  Run game coordinator/Offensive line
- Tim Janecek
  Defensive line
- Marcus Knight
  Wide receivers
- Paul Rice
  Tight ends
- Chris Bergeski
  Running backs

Legend

- (C) Team captain
- (S) Suspended
- (I) Ineligible
- Injured
- Redshirt

Roster
Last update: January 22, 2026

== Game summaries ==
=== Holy Cross ===
Holy Cross Crusaders (0–3) at Yale Bulldogs (0–0) – Game summary

Quarter	1	2	3	4	Total
Crusaders	0	0	3	7	10
Bulldogs	7	0	14	7	28

at Yale Bowl, New Haven, CT

- Date: September 20
- Game time: 12:00 p.m. EDT
- Game weather: Sunny • Temperature: 70 °F (21 °C) • Wind: SW at 6 miles per hour (9.7 km/h)
- Game attendance: 4,469
- Referee: Alex Parrella
- TV announcers (ESPN+): Jim Cain (play-by-play) and Jack Siedlecki (analyst)

Game information
First quarter
- (9:16) YALE – Josh Pitsenberger 1-yard run, Nick Conforti kick (Drive: 12 plays, 76 yards, 5:38; Yale 7–0)

Second quarter

- No scoring plays

Third quarter

- (11:08) HC – Luis Palenzuela 23-yard field goal (Drive: 7 plays, 84 yards, 3:47; Yale 7–3)
- (7:20) YALE – Josh Pitsenberger 1-yard run, Nick Conforti kick (Drive: 9 plays, 77 yards, 3:43; Yale 14–3)
- (3:02) YALE – Nico Brown 29-yard pass from Dante Reno, Nick Conforti kick (Drive: 5 plays, 69 yards, 1:55; Yale 21–3)

Fourth quarter

- (11:49) YALE – Josh Pitsenberger 10-yard run, Nick Conforti kick (Drive: 9 plays, 47 yards, 4:35; Yale 28–3)
- (0:56) HC – Charly Mullaly 7-yard pass from Cal Swanson, Luis Palenzuela kick (Drive: 13 plays, 63 yards, 4:33; Yale 28–10)

Statistics	HC	YALE
First downs	19	18
Total yards	281	318
Rushing yards	88	152
Passing yards	193	166
Turnovers	1	0
Time of possession	29:15	30:45

Team	Category	Player	Statistics
Holy Cross	Passing	Cal Swanson	15/30, 193 yards, TD
Holy Cross	Rushing	Nyeoti Punni	6 carries, 36 yards
Holy Cross	Receiving	Joseph Williams	1 reception, 64 yards
Yale	Passing	Dante Reno	13/18, 166 yards, TD
Yale	Rushing	Josh Pitsenberger	26 carries, 127 yards, 3 TD
Yale	Receiving	Nico Brown	5 receptions, 119 yards, TD

=== Cornell ===
Cornell Big Red (0–1) at Yale Bulldogs (1–0) – Game summary

Quarter	1	2	3	4	Total
Big Red	7	7	7	3	24
Bulldogs	7	7	13	14	41

at Yale Bowl, New Haven, CT

- Date: September 27
- Game time: 12:00 p.m. EDT
- Referee: Tom Zetts
- TV announcers (ESPN+): Jim Cain (play-by-play) and Jack Siedlecki (analyst)

Game information

First quarter

- (5:50) COR – Devin Page 1-yard run, Alan Zhao kick (Drive: 13 plays, 52 yards, 4:59; Cornell 7-0)
- (2:47) YALE – Josh Pitsenberger 3-yard run, Nick Conforti kick (Drive: 13 plays, 52 yards, 4:59; Yale 7-7)

Second quarter

- (11:31) YALE – Josh Pitsenberger 48-yard run, Nick Conforti kick (Drive: 3 plays, 56 yards, 1:01; Yale 14-7)
- (6:59) COR – Doryn Smith 3-yard pass from Devin Page, Alan Zhao kick (Drive: 9 plays, 38 yards, 3:33; 14-14)

Third quarter

- (12:16) YALE – Noah Piper 50-yard field goal (Drive: 4 plays, 65 yards, 1:37; Yale 17-14)
- (8:15) YALE – Noah Piper 36-yard field goal (Drive: 4 plays, -3 yards, 1:55; Yale 20-14)
- (7:54) YALE – Jaxton Santiago 20-yard pass from Dante Reno, Nick Conforti kick (Drive: 1 play, 20 yards, 0:05; Yale 27-14)
- (4:33) COR – Ryder Kurtz 21-yard pass from Devin Page, Alan Zhao kick (Drive: 7 plays, 80 yards, 3:14; Yale 27-21)

Fourth quarter

- (9:32) COR – Alan Zhao 32-yard field goal (Drive: 12 plays, 69 yards, 4:40; Yale 27-24)
- (1:56) YALE – Josh Pitsenberger 4-yard run, Nick Conforti kick (Drive: 9 plays, 75 yards, 1:09; Yale 34-24)
- (0:47) YALE – Abu Kamara 65-yard interception return, Nick Conforti kick (Drive: 9 plays, 75 yards, 1:09; Yale 41-24)

Statistics	COR	YALE
First downs	25	12
Total yards	400	297
Rushing yards	133	158
Passing yards	267	139
Turnovers	5	3
Time of possession	35:52	24:08

Team	Category	Player	Statistics
Cornell	Passing	Devin Page	24/51, 2 TD, 4 INT
Cornell	Rushing	Robert Tucker III	15 carries, 53 yards
Cornell	Receiving	Ryder Kurtz	5 receptions, 91 yards, TD
Yale	Passing	Dante Reno	14/23, 139 yards, TD, INT
Yale	Rushing	Josh Pitsenberger	28 carries, 142 yards, 3 TD
Yale	Receiving	Mason Shipp	7 receptions, 85 yards

=== at No. 9 Lehigh (Yank Townsend Trophy) ===
Yale Bulldogs (2–0) at No. 9 Lehigh Mountain Hawks (5–0) – Game summary

Quarter	1	2	3	4	Total
Bulldogs	0	7	6	0	13
No. 9 Mountain Hawks	14	0	10	7	31

at Goodman Stadium, Lower Saucon Township, PA

- Date: October 4
- Game time: 12:00 PM EDT
- Game weather: Sunny • Temperature: 74 °F (23 °C) • Wind: W at 2 miles per hour (3.2 km/h)
- Game attendance: 4,364
- Referee: Anthony Florio
- TV announcers (ESPN+): Marco Socci (play-by-play) and Mike Yadush (analyst)

Game information
First quarter
- (LEH): 11:14 - Mason Humphrey 27 yard pass from Hayden Johnson, Nick Garrido kick (Drive: 8 plays, 67 yards, 3:40 LEH 7-0)
- (LEH): 2:59 - Luke Yoder 24 yard pass from Hayden Johnson, Nick Garrido kick (Drive: 11 plays, 90 yards, 6:46 LEH 14-0)

Second quarter

- (YALE): 0:43 - Nico Brown 27 yard pass from Dante Reno, Nick Conforti kick (Drive: 15 plays, 89 yards, 5:32 LEH 14-7)

Third quarter

- (LEH): 9:47 - Luke Yoder 25 yard run, Nick Garrido kick (Drive: 3 plays, 86 yards, 1:27 LEH 21-7)
- (YALE): 6:18 - Nico Brown 44 yard pass from Dante Reno, Nick Conforti missed PAT (Drive: 8 plays, 75 yards, 3:20 LEH 21-13)
- (LEH): 1:50 - Nick Garrido 24 yard field goal (Drive: 8 plays, 68 yards, 4:28 LEH 24-13)

Fourth quarter

- (LEH): 2:07 - Hayden Johnson 9 yard run, Nick Garrido kick (Drive: 9 plays, 68 yards, 3:59 LEH 31-13)

Statistics	YALE	LEH
First downs	22	22
Total yards	350	399
Rushing yards	103	225
Passing yards	247	174
Turnovers	3	0
Time of possession	28:38	31:22

Team	Category	Player	Statistics
Yale	Passing	Dante Reno	25/38, 247 yards, 2 TD, 2 INT
Yale	Rushing	Josh Pitsenberger	18 carries, 63 yards
Yale	Receiving	Nico Brown	7 receptions, 85 yards, 2 TD
Lehigh	Passing	Hayden Johnson	8/15, 174 yards, 2 TD
Lehigh	Rushing	Luke Yoder	17 carries, 108 yards, TD
Lehigh	Receiving	Mason Humphrey	2 receptions, 86 yards, TD

=== at Dartmouth ===
Yale Bulldogs (2–1) at Dartmouth Big Green (2–1) – Game summary

Quarter	1	2	3	4	Total
Bulldogs	0	3	7	6	16
Big Green	0	0	0	17	17

at Memorial Field, Hanover, NH

- Date: October 11
- Game time: 1:30 p.m. EDT
- Game weather: Sunny, SW 7 mph
- Game attendance: 7,895
- Referee: Jeremy DeAngulo
- TV announcers (ESPN+): Matt Corsetti (play-by-play) and Ryan Zimmerman (analyst)

Game information
First quarter
- No scoring plays

Second quarter

- YALE - Nick Conforti 41-yard Field Goal, 7:27. Bulldogs 3-0. Drive: 11 plays, 39 yards, 4:45.

Third quarter

- YALE - Nico Brown 6-yard pass from Dante Reno (Noah Piper kick), 4:59. Bulldogs 10-0. Drive: 1 play, 6 yards, 0:07.

Fourth quarter

- DART - Grayson Saunier 6-yard run (Owen Zalc kick), 10:24. Bulldogs 10-7. Drive: 11 plays, 92 yards, 5:11.
- DART - Grayson Saunier 37-yard run (Owen Zalc kick), 4:13. Big Green 14-10. Drive: 6 plays, 75 yards, 3:00.
- YALE - Graham Smith 4-yard pass from Dante Reno (Noah Piper PAT failed), 0:37. Bulldogs 16-14. Drive: 13 plays, 70 yards, 3:29.
- DART - Owen Zalc 51-yard Field Goal, 0:00. Big Green 17-16. Drive: 7 plays, 42 yards, 0:37.

Statistics	YALE	DART
First downs	22	25
Total yards	352	367
Rushing yards	156	209
Passing yards	196	158
Turnovers	1	1
Time of possession	30:04	29:56

Team	Category	Player	Statistics
Yale	Passing	Dante Reno	19/32, 196 yards, 2 TD, INT
Yale	Rushing	Josh Pitsenberger	34 carries, 138 yards
Yale	Receiving	Nico Brown	8 receptions, 113 yards, TD
Dartmouth	Passing	Grayson Saunier	15/22, 158 yards
Dartmouth	Rushing	Grayson Saunier	14 carries, 95 yards, 2 TD
Dartmouth	Receiving	Grayson O'Bara	5 receptions, 69 yards

=== Stonehill ===
Stonehill Skyhawks (2–4) at Yale Bulldogs (2–2) – Game summary

Quarter	1	2	3	4	Total
Skyhawks	0	0	0	7	7
Bulldogs	10	13	17	7	47

at Yale Bowl, New Haven, CT

- Date: October 18
- Game time: 12:00 p.m. EDT
- Referee: Eric Lewis
- TV announcers (ESPN+): Jim Cain (play-by-play) and Jack Siedlecki (analyst)

Game information

First quarter

- (9:24) YALE – Noah Piper 26-yard field goal (Drive: 13 plays, 40 yards, 5:29; Yale 3-0)
- (0:30) YALE – Josh Pitsenberger 6-yard run, Noah Piper kick (Drive: 14 plays, 67 yards, 7:06; Yale 10-0)

Second quarter

- (14:05) YALE – Wilhelm Daal 25-yard run, Noah Piper kick (Drive: 2 plays, 27 yards, 0:38; Yale 17-0)
- (4:57) YALE – Noah Piper 26-yard field goal (Drive: 11 plays, 50 yards, 5:29; Yale 20-0)
- (0:20) YALE – Noah Piper 39-yard field goal (Drive: 13 plays, 78 yards, 2:04; Yale 23-0)

Third quarter

- (9:55) YALE – Josh Pitsenberger 1-yard run, Noah Piper kick (Drive: 6 plays, 85 yards, 2:09; Yale 30-0)
- (7:26) YALE – Jaxton Santiago 48-yard pass from Dante Reno, Noah Piper kick (Drive: 1 play, 48 yards, 0:10; Yale 37-0)
- (2:57) YALE – Noah Piper 38-yard field goal (Drive: 8 plays, 38 yards, 3:04; Yale 40-0)

Fourth quarter

- (11:00) YALE – Cameron Price 2-yard run, Noah Piper kick (Drive: 13 plays, 62 yards, 5:25; Yale 47-0)
- (0:35) STO – Aidan Garrett 1-yard run, Domenic Scalese kick (Drive: 12 plays, 57 yards, 4:54; Yale 47-7)

Statistics	STO	YALE
First downs	12	27
Total yards	152	481
Rushing yards	35	191
Passing yards	117	290
Turnovers	0	0
Time of possession	26:22	33:38

Team	Category	Player	Statistics
Stonehill	Passing	Jack O'Connell	13/28, 109 yards
Stonehill	Rushing	Deven Sisler	3 carries, 23 yards
Stonehill	Receiving	Derek Varley	2 receptions, 28 yards
Yale	Passing	Dante Reno	16/24, 267 yards, TD
Yale	Rushing	Josh Pitsenberger	13 carries, 69 yards, 2 TD
Yale	Receiving	Jaxton Santiago	5 receptions, 150 yards, TD

=== Penn ===
Penn Quakers (4–1) at Yale Bulldogs (3–2) – Game summary

Quarter	1	2	3	4	Total
Quakers	3	7	3	0	13
Bulldogs	7	21	7	0	35

at Yale Bowl, New Haven, CT

- Date: October 25
- Game time: 12:00 p.m. EDT
- Game attendance: 4,412
- Referee: Jeff Pumphrey
- TV announcers (ESPN+): Jim Cain (play-by-play) and Jack Siedlecki (analyst)

Game information

First quarter

- (13:11) PENN – Mason Walters 28-yard field goal (Drive: 4 plays, 4 yards, 1:05; Penn 3-0)
- (1:09) YALE – Josh Pitsenberger 10-yard run, Noah Piper kick (Drive: 10 plays, 85 yards, 4:45; Yale 7-3)

Second quarter

- (13:44) YALE – Abu Kamara 63-yard fumble return, Noah Piper kick (Drive: 5 plays, -18 yards, 2:21; Yale 14-3)
- (12:57) YALE – Jaxton Santiago 26-yard pass from Dante Reno, Noah Piper kick (Drive: 2 plays, 35 yards, 0:29; Yale 21-3)
- (6:56) PENN – Jared Richardson 13-yard pass from Liam O'Brien, Mason Walters kick (Drive: 11 plays, 77 yards, 5:52; Yale 21-10)
- (1:55) YALE – Nico Brown 19-yard pass from Dante Reno, Noah Piper kick (Drive: 6 plays, 67 yards, 2:53; Yale 28-10)

Third quarter

- (5:01) PENN – Mason Walters 28-yard field goal (Drive: 8 plays, 47 yards, 4:18; Penn 28-13)
- (1:53) YALE – Nico Brown 33-yard pass from Dante Reno, Noah Piper kick (Drive: 7 plays, 75 yards, 3:08; Yale 35-13)

Fourth quarter

No scoring plays

Statistics	PENN	YALE
First downs	24	21
Total yards	312	413
Rushing yards	92	202
Passing yards	220	211
Turnovers	2	2
Time of possession	36:44	23:16

Team	Category	Player	Statistics
Penn	Passing	Liam O'Brien	21/39, 220 yards, TD
Penn	Rushing	Donte West	11 carries, 47 yards
Penn	Receiving	Jared Richardson	6 receptions, 85 yards, TD
Yale	Passing	Dante Reno	16/22, 211 yards, 3 TD
Yale	Rushing	Josh Pitsenberger	22 carries, 145 yards, TD
Yale	Receiving	Nico Brown	8 receptions, 121 yards, 2 TD

=== Columbia ===
Columbia Lions (1–5) at Yale Bulldogs (4–2) – Game summary

Quarter	1	2	3	4	Total
Lions	0	7	0	3	10
Bulldogs	0	14	10	0	24

at Yale Bowl, New Haven, CT

- Date: November 1
- Game time: 12:00 p.m. EDT
- Game weather: Sunny • Temperature: 52 °F (11 °C) • Wind: NW at 12 miles per hour (19 km/h)
- Game attendance: 4,375
- Referee: Antonio Marcella
- TV announcers (ESPN+): Jim Cain (play-by-play) and Jack Siedlecki (analyst)

Game information

First quarter

No scoring plays

Second quarter

- (13:22) YALE – Jaxton Santiago 7-yard pass from Dante Reno, Noah Piper kick (Drive: 14 plays, 82 yards, 5:50; Yale 7-0)
- (4:52) YALE – Nico Brown 7-yard pass from Dante Reno, Noah Piper kick (Drive: 3 plays, 80 yards, 0:46; Yale 14-0)
- (0:13) COLU – Titus Evans 6-yard pass from Chase Goodwin, Hugo Merry kick (Drive: 9 plays, 52 yards, 1:23; Yale 14-7)

Third quarter

- (5:35) YALE – Noah Piper 40-yard field goal (Drive: 8 plays, 58 yards, 3:05; Yale 17-7)
- (3:43) YALE – Wilhelm Daal 81-yard run, Noah Piper kick (Drive: 1 play, 81 yards, 0:11; Yale 24-7)

Fourth quarter

- (7:08) COLU – Hugo Merry 29-yard field goal (Drive: 14 plays, 72 yards, 6:54; Yale 24-10)

Statistics	COLU	YALE
First downs	15	21
Total yards	270	432
Rushing yards	62	253
Passing yards	208	179
Turnovers	0	0
Time of possession	29:09	30:51

Team	Category	Player	Statistics
Columbia	Passing	Chase Goodwin	15/30, 208 yards, TD
Columbia	Rushing	Michael Walters	11 carries, 52 yards
Columbia	Receiving	Lucas Bullock	3 receptions, 78 yards
Yale	Passing	Dante Reno	16/25, 179 yards, 2 TD
Yale	Rushing	Josh Pitsenberger	25 carries, 132 yards
Yale	Receiving	Jaxton Santiago	5 receptions, 92 yards, TD

=== at Brown ===
Yale Bulldogs (5–2) at Brown Bears (3–4) – Game summary

Quarter	1	2	3	4	Total
Bulldogs	14	7	7	6	34
Bears	0	9	7	6	22

at Brown Stadium, Providence, RI

- Date: November 8
- Game time: 12:00 p.m. EDT
- Game attendance: 3,009
- Referee: Jeremy DeAngulo
- TV: ESPN+

Game information

First quarter

- (14:41) YALE – Josh Pitsenberger 62-yard run, Noah Piper kick (Drive: 1 play, 62 yards, 0:11; Yale 7-0)
- (2:10) YALE – Nico Brown 12-yard pass from Dante Reno, Noah Piper kick (Drive: 11 plays, 70 yards, 4:59; Yale 14-0)

Second quarter

- (13:16) BRWN – Drew Crabtree 29-yard field goal (Drive: 11 plays, 64 yards, 3:54; Yale 14-3)
- (5:12) YALE – Nico Brown 21-yard pass from Dante Reno, Noah Piper kick (Drive: 7 plays, 70 yards, 2:45; Yale 21-3)
- (1:57) BRWN – Drew Crabtree 25-yard field goal (Drive: 10 plays, 68 yards, 3:15; Yale 21-6)
- (0:00) BRWN – Drew Crabtree 36-yard field goal (Drive: 8 plays, 25 yards, 0:43; Yale 21-9)

Third quarter

- (3:08) YALE – Josh Pitsenberger 1-yard run, Noah Piper kick (Drive: 4 plays, 53 yards, 1:33; Yale 28-9)
- (0:02) BRWN – Matt Childs 5-yard run, Drew Crabtree kick (Drive: 7 plays, 75 yards, 3:06; Yale 28-16)

Fourth quarter

- (10:51) YALE – Noah Piper 33-yard field goal (Drive: 9 plays, 60 yards, 4:11; Yale 31-16)
- (7:38) YALE – Noah Piper 40-yard field goal (Drive: 4 plays, 4 yards, 1:17; Yale 34-16)
- (7:06) BRWN – Ty Pezza 55-yard pass from James Murphy, two-point pass conversion failed (Drive: 3 plays, 75 yards, 0:32; Yale 34-22)

Statistics	YALE	BRWN
First downs	21	21
Total yards	463	385
Rushing yards	255	19
Passing yards	208	366
Turnovers	1	2
Time of possession	31:51	28:09

Team	Category	Player	Statistics
Yale	Passing	Dante Reno	20/28, 208 yards, 2 TD
Yale	Rushing	Josh Pitsenberger	27 carries, 173 yards, 2 TD
Yale	Receiving	Nico Brown	6 receptions, 103 yards, 2 TD
Brown	Passing	James Murphy	26/42, 366 yards, TD, INT
Brown	Rushing	Matt Childs	16 carries, 41 yards, TD
Brown	Receiving	Trevor Foley	6 receptions, 145 yards

=== at Princeton (rivalry) ===
Yale Bulldogs (6–2) at Princeton Tigers (3–5) – Game summary

Quarter	1	2	3	4	Total
Bulldogs	0	10	0	3	13
Tigers	3	0	0	7	10

at Princeton Stadium, Princeton, NJ

- Date: November 15
- Game time: 12:00 p.m. EDT
- Game weather: Sunny • Temperature: 48 °F (9 °C) • Wind: S at 2 miles per hour (3.2 km/h)
- Game attendance: 4,704
- Referee: Bill McKeever
- TV: ESPN+

Game information

First quarter

- (0:33) PRIN – Esteban Nunez Perez 29-yard field goal (Drive: 11 plays, 68 yards, 5:29; Princeton 3-0)

Second quarter

- (6:53) YALE – Noah Piper 37-yard field goal (Drive: 10 plays, 52 yards, 4:28; 3-3)
- (3:48) YALE – Josh Pitsenberger 1-yard run, Noah Piper kick (Drive: 4 plays, 65 yards, 1:37; Yale 10-3)

Third quarter

No scoring plays

Fourth quarter

- (8:46) PRIN – Ethan Clark 1-yard run, Esteban Nunez Perez kick (Drive: 7 plays, 63 yards, 3:53; 10-10)
- (3:50) YALE – Noah Piper 37-yard field goal (Drive: 12 plays, 55 yards, 4:56; Yale 13-10)

Statistics	YALE	PRIN
First downs	12	18
Total yards	273	313
Rushing yards	119	136
Passing yards	154	177
Turnovers	2	2
Time of possession	25:36	34:24

Team	Category	Player	Statistics
Yale	Passing	Dante Reno	11/16, 154 yards, 2 INT
Yale	Rushing	Josh Pitsenberger	24 carries, 106 yards, TD
Yale	Receiving	Nico Brown	5 receptions, 102 yards
Princeton	Passing	Kai Colón	11/23, 177 yards, INT
Princeton	Rushing	Ethan Clark	24 carries, 90 yards, TD
Princeton	Receiving	Josh Robinson	7 receptions, 113 yards

=== No. 8 Harvard ===
No. 8 Harvard Crimson (9–0) at Yale Bulldogs (7–2) – Game summary

Quarter	1	2	3	4	Total
No. 8 Crimson	0	14	6	8	28
Bulldogs	10	21	7	7	45

at Yale Bowl, New Haven, CT

- Date: November 22
- Game time: 12:00 PM EST
- Game weather: Sunny
- Game attendance: 52,497
- Referee: Todd Boyd
- TV: ESPNU

Game information
First quarter
- YALE – Jaxton Santiago 21-yard pass from Dante Reno (Noah Piper kick), 14:42. Bulldogs 7–0. Drive: 1 play, 21 yards, 0:06.
- YALE – Noah Piper 40-yard field goal, 6:12. Bulldogs 10–0. Drive: 7 plays, 21 yards, 2:30.

Second quarter

- YALE – Josh Pitsenberger 8-yard run (Noah Piper kick), 13:02. Bulldogs 17–0. Drive: 12 plays, 79 yards, 6:11.
- HARV – Ryan Tattersall 23-yard pass from Jaden Craig (Kieran Corr kick), 13:02. Bulldogs 17–7. Drive: 11 plays, 75 yards, 4:03.
- YALE – Nico Brown 64-yard pass from Dante Reno (Noah Piper kick), 8:59. Bulldogs 24–7. Drive: 3 plays, 75 yards, 1:25.
- HARV – Jaden Craig 26-yard run (Kieran Corr kick), 4:19. Bulldogs 24–14. Drive: 9 plays, 75 yards, 3:15.
- YALE – Josh Pitsenberger 1-yard run (Noah Piper kick), 0:03. Bulldogs 31–14. Drive: 11 plays, 75 yards, 4:19.

Third quarter

- YALE – Josh Pitsenberger 4-yard run (Noah Piper kick), 8:55. Bulldogs 38–14. Drive: 11 plays, 75 yards, 6:05.
- HARV – Ryan Tattersall 9-yard pass from Jaden Craig (pass failed), 4:44. Bulldogs 38–20. Drive: 11 plays, 75 yards, 4:11.

Fourth quarter

- YALE – Lucius Anderson 12-yard pass from Dante Reno (Noah Piper kick), 15:00. Bulldogs 45–20. Drive: 4 plays, 81 yards, 1:36.
- HARV – Brady Blackburn 31-yard pass from Jaden Craig (Ryan Tattersall pass to Jaden Craig), 14:56. Bulldogs 45–28. Drive: 8 plays, 75 yards, 3:11.

Statistics	HARV	YALE
First downs	27	23
Total yards	412	445
Rushing yards	94	172
Passing yards	318	273
Turnovers	1	0
Time of possession	26:18	33:42

Team	Category	Player	Statistics
Harvard	Passing	Jaden Craig	23/43, 266 yards, 3 TD
Harvard	Rushing	Xaviah Bascon	9 rushes, 53 yards
Harvard	Receiving	Ryan Tattersall	5 receptions, 92 yards, 2 TD
Yale	Passing	Dante Reno	15/19, 273 yards, 3 TD
Yale	Rushing	Josh Pitsenberger	38 rushes, 143 yards, 3 TD
Yale	Receiving	Nico Brown	8 receptions, 189 yards, TD

=== at No. 14 Youngstown State (NCAA Division I Playoffs – First round) ===
No. 24 Yale Bulldogs (8–2) at No. 14 Youngstown State Penguins (8–4) – Game summary

Quarter	1	2	3	4	Total
No. 24 Bulldogs	0	7	15	21	43
No. 14 Penguins	14	21	7	0	42

at Stambaugh Stadium, Youngstown, Ohio

- Date: November 29
- Game time: 12:00 p.m. EST
- Game weather: Cloudy • Temperature: 33 °F (1 °C) • Wind: SW at 5 miles per hour (8.0 km/h)
- Game attendance: 4,869
- Referee: Charles Green
- TV announcers (ESPN+): Anthony Lima (play by play) and Marcus Ray (analyst)
- Box score

Game information
First quarter
- YSU – Max Tomczak 23-yard pass from Beau Brungard (Andrew Lastovka kick), 11:35. Penguins 7–0. Drive: 8 plays, 79 yards, 3:20.
- YSU – Beau Brungard 6-yard run (Andrew Lastovka kick), 6:17. Penguins 14–0. Drive: 6 plays, 55 yards, 2:58.

Second quarter

- YSU – Max Tomczak 6-yard pass from Beau Brungard (Andrew Lastovka kick), 10:40. Penguins 21–0. Drive: 3 plays, 19 yards, 1:45.
- YALE – Josh Pitsenberger 4-yard run (Noah Piper kick), 7:38. Penguins 21–7. Drive: 7 plays, 66 yards, 2:55.
- YSU – Beau Brungard 1-yard run (Andrew Lastovka kick), 6:10. Penguins 28–7. Drive: 4 plays, 75 yards, 1:28.
- YSU – Beau Brungard 6-yard run (Andrew Lastovka kick), 0:16. Penguins 35–7. Drive: 5 plays, 35 yards, 0:56.

Third quarter

- YALE – Spencer Mermans 4-yard pass from Dante Reno (Noah Piper kick), 9:21. Penguins 35–14. Drive: 13 plays, 75 yards, 5:39.
- YSU – Max Tomczak 7-yard pass from Beau Brungard (Andrew Lastovka kick), 7:37. Penguins 42–14. Drive: 3 plays, 75 yards, 1:44.
- YALE – Josh Pitsenberger 1-yard run (Dante Reno pass to Graham Smith), 2:41. Penguins 42–22. Drive: 11 plays, 77 yards, 4:52.

Fourth quarter

- YALE – Lucius Anderson 11-yard pass from Dante Reno (Noah Piper kick), 14:54. Penguins 42–29. Drive: 7 plays, 37 yards, 2:38.
- YALE – Graham Smith 4-yard pass from Dante Reno (Noah Piper kick), 5:19. Penguins 42–36. Drive: 12 plays, 72 yards, 4:36.
- YALE – Josh Pitsenberger 56-yard run (Noah Piper kick), 2:47. Bulldogs 43–42. Drive: 1 play, 56 yards, 0:10.

Statistics	YALE	YSU
First downs	26	21
Total yards	453	491
Rushing yards	193	174
Passing yards	260	317
Turnovers	3	1
Time of possession	34:02	25:58

Team	Category	Player	Statistics
Yale	Passing	Dante Reno	21/38, 260 yards, 3 TD, 2 INT
Yale	Rushing	Josh Pitsenberger	32 rushes, 209 yards, 3 TD
Yale	Receiving	Lucius Anderson	8 receptions, 138 yards, TD
Youngstown State	Passing	Beau Brungard	23/35, 317 yards, 3 TD
Youngstown State	Rushing	Beau Brungard	17 rushes, 90 yards, 3 TD
Youngstown State	Receiving	Max Tomczak	6 receptions, 105 yards, 3 TD

=== at No. 2 Montana State (NCAA Division I Playoffs – Second round) ===
2025 NCAA Division I FCS Playoffs Second Round
No. 24 Yale Bulldogs (9–2) at No. 2 (2) Montana State Bobcats (10–2) – Game summary

Quarter	1	2	3	4	Total
No. 24 Bulldogs	0	0	0	13	13
No. 2 (2) Bobcats	7	0	7	7	21

at Bobcat Stadium, Bozeman, Montana

- Date: December 6
- Game time: 2:00 p.m. EST / 12:00 p.m. MST
- Game weather: Snow, 36 °F (2 °C)
- Game attendance: 20,867
- Referee: Zach Erdmann
- TV announcers (ESPN+): Jason Ross Jr. (play by play) and Tyoka Jackson (analyst)

Game information

First quarter

- MTST – Chris Long 0-yard fumble return (Myles Sansted kick), 2:56. Bobcats 7–0.

Second quarter

- No scoring plays.

Third quarter

- MTST – Julius Davis 3-yard run (Myles Sansted kick), 1:51. Bobcats 14–0. Drive: 9 plays, 70 yards, 4:18.

Fourth quarter

- YALE – Nico Brown 25-yard pass from Dante Reno (run failed), 14:18. Bobcats 14–6. Drive: 5 plays, 61 yards, 2:33.
- MTST – Adam Jones 33-yard run (Myles Sansted kick), 10:20. Bobcats 21–6. Drive: 7 plays, 73 yards, 3:58.
- YALE – Josh Pitsenberger 6-yard run (Noah Piper kick), 2:09. Bobcats 21–13. Drive: 5 plays, 54 yards, 2:01.

Statistics	YALE	MTST
First downs	24	20
Plays–yards	75–351	58–341
Rushes–yards	39–153	42–249
Passing yards	198	92
Passing: Comp–Att–Int	20–36–3	10–16–0
Turnovers	4	1
Time of possession	33:55	26:05

Team	Category	Player	Statistics
Yale	Passing	Dante Reno	20/35, 198 yards, TD, 2 INT
Yale	Rushing	Josh Pitsenberger	26 carries, 124 yards, TD
Yale	Receiving	Nico Brown	11 receptions, 107 yards, TD
Montana State	Passing	Justin Lamson	10/16, 92 yards
Montana State	Rushing	Adam Jones	18 carries, 107 yards, TD
Montana State	Receiving	Adam Jones	2 receptions, 34 yards
