= 2004 Fordham Rams football team =

American college football season

2004 Fordham Rams football
- Conference: Patriot League
- Record: 5–6 (2–4 Patriot)
- Head coach: Ed Foley (1st season)
- Captains: Jared Amatuzzo; NaQuinton Gainous; Edward Gordon; Tad Kornegay
- Home stadium: Coffey Field

2004 Patriot League football standings
	Conf.			Overall
Team	W		L	W		L
No. 15 Lehigh +^	5	–	1	9	–	3
No. 19 Lafayette +^	5	–	1	8	–	4
Bucknell	4	–	2	7	–	4
Colgate	4	–	2	7	–	4
Fordham	2	–	4	5	–	6
Holy Cross	1	–	5	3	–	8
Georgetown	0	–	6	3	–	8
+ – Conference co-champions; ^ – NCAA Division I-AA playoff participant; Rankings from The Sports Network poll

The 2004 Fordham Rams football team was an American football team that represented Fordham University during the 2004 NCAA Division I-AA football season. Fordham finished fifth in the Patriot League.

In their first year under head coach Ed Foley, the Rams compiled a 5–6 record. Jared Amatuzzo, NaQuinton Gainous, Edward Gordon and Tad Kornegay were the team captains.

Despite their losing record, the Rams outscored opponents 288 to 270. Their 2–4 conference record placed fifth out of seven in the Patriot League standings.

Fordham played its home games at Jack Coffey Field on the university's Rose Hill campus in The Bronx, in New York City.

== Schedule ==
Date	Opponent	Site	Result	Attendance	Source
September 4	Rhode Island*	Coffey Field; Bronx, NY	L 36–37	4,460	
September 11	at Albany*	University Field; Albany, NY	W 14–0	4,411	
September 18	at Columbia*	Wien Stadium; New York, NY (Liberty Cup)	W 17–14	2,176	
September 25	Duquesne*	Coffey Field; Bronx, NY	W 41–34	5,500	
October 2	at Holy Cross	Fitton Field; Worcester, MA (rivalry)	W 42–35	5,222	
October 9	Brown^{†}*	Coffey Field; Bronx, NY	L 20–27 ^{OT}	4,950	
October 23	Lafayette	Coffey Field; Bronx, NY	L 20–35	3,150	
October 30	Georgetown	Coffey Field; Bronx, NY	W 36–6	3,180	
November 6	at Bucknell	Christy Mathewson–Memorial Stadium; Lewisburg, PA	L 20–21	5,842	
November 13	at No. 8 Lehigh	Goodman Stadium; Bethlehem, PA	L 14–21	6,218	
November 20	Colgate	Coffey Field; Bronx, NY	L 28–40	2,760	
*Non-conference game; ^{†}Homecoming; Rankings from The Sports Network Poll released prior to the game
