= 2004 Princeton Tigers football team =

American college football season

2004 Princeton Tigers football
- Conference: Ivy League
- Record: 5–5 (3–4 Ivy)
- Head coach: Roger Hughes (5th season)
- Captains: Justin Stull; Jon Veach
- Home stadium: Princeton Stadium

2004 Ivy League football standings
	Conf.			Overall
Team	W		L	W		L
No. 13 Harvard $	7	–	0	10	–	0
No. 21 Penn	6	–	1	8	–	2
Cornell	4	–	3	4	–	6
Brown	3	–	4	6	–	4
Princeton	3	–	4	5	–	5
Yale	3	–	4	5	–	5
Dartmouth	1	–	6	1	–	9
Columbia	1	–	6	1	–	9
$ – Conference champion; Rankings from The Sports Network poll

The 2004 Princeton Tigers football team was an American football team that represented Princeton University during the 2004 NCAA Division I-AA football season. The Tigers tied for fourth in the Ivy League.

In their fifth year under head coach Roger Hughes, the Tigers compiled a 5–5 record, and outscored opponents 211 to 207. Justin Stull and Jon Veach were the team captains.

Princeton's 3–4 conference record placed it in a three-way tie for fourth place in the Ivy League standings. The Tigers were outscored 143 to 126 by Ivy opponents.

The Tigers played their home games at Princeton Stadium on the university campus in Princeton, New Jersey.

== Schedule ==
Date	Opponent	Site	Result	Attendance	Source
September 18	Lafayette*	Princeton Stadium; Princeton, NJ	W 35–18	8,691	
September 25	at San Diego*	Torero Stadium; San Diego, CA	W 24–17	3,528	
October 2	at Columbia	Wien Stadium; New York, NY	W 27–26 ^{OT}	10,823	
October 9	No. 20 Colgate*	Princeton Stadium; Princeton, NJ	L 26–29	7,893	
October 16	Brown	Princeton Stadium; Princeton, NJ	W 24–10	11,982	
October 23	No. 22 Harvard	Princeton Stadium; Princeton, NJ (rivalry)	L 14–39	14,304	
October 30	at Cornell	Schoellkopf Field; Ithaca, NY	L 20–21	5,842	
November 6	No. 20 Penn	Princeton Stadium; Princeton, NJ (rivalry)	L 15–16	15,891	
November 13	at Yale	Yale Bowl; New Haven, CT (rivalry)	L 9–21	15,296	
November 20	Dartmouth	Princeton Stadium; Princeton, NJ	W 17–10	13,852	
*Non-conference game; Rankings from The Sports Network Poll released prior to the game
