= 2004 Lafayette Leopards football team =

American college football season

2004 Lafayette Leopards football

Patriot League co-champion

NCAA Division I-AA First Round, L 14–28 at Delaware
- Conference: Patriot League

Ranking
- Sports Network: No. 19
- FCS Coaches: No. 19
- Record: 8–4 (5–1 Patriot)
- Head coach: Frank Tavani (5th season)
- Offensive coordinator: Mike Faragalli (5th season)
- Offensive scheme: Multiple
- Defensive coordinator: John Loose (5th season)
- Base defense: 4–3
- Home stadium: Fisher Field

2004 Patriot League football standings
	Conf.			Overall
Team	W		L	W		L
No. 15 Lehigh +^	5	–	1	9	–	3
No. 19 Lafayette +^	5	–	1	8	–	4
Bucknell	4	–	2	7	–	4
Colgate	4	–	2	7	–	4
Fordham	2	–	4	5	–	6
Holy Cross	1	–	5	3	–	8
Georgetown	0	–	6	3	–	8
+ – Conference co-champions; ^ – NCAA Division I-AA playoff participant; Rankings from The Sports Network poll

The 2004 Lafayette Leopards football team represented Lafayette College as member of the Patriot League during the 2004 NCAA Division I-AA football season. Led by fifth-year head coach Frank Tavani, the Leopards compiled an overall record of 8–4 with a mark of 5–1 in conference play, sharing the Patriot League title with Lehigh. Lafayette advanced to the NCAA Division I-AA Football Championship playoffs, where the Leopards lost in the first round to Delaware. The game was first postseason contest in program history. Lafayette played home games at Fisher Field in Easton, Pennsylvania.

Tavani was named a finalist for the Eddie Robinson Coach of the Year Award. All games were televised by the Lafayette Sports Network (LSN).

== Schedule ==
Date	Time	Opponent	Rank	Site	TV	Result	Attendance	Source
September 4	1:00 p.m.	Marist*		Fisher Field; Easton, PA	LSN	W 48–7	4,283	
September 11	1:00 p.m.	at Georgetown		Harbin Field; Washington, DC	LSN	W 17–6	1,842	
September 18	6:00 p.m.	at Princeton*		Princeton Stadium; Princeton, NJ	LSN	L 18–35	8,691	
September 25	1:00 p.m.	at Richmond*		University of Richmond Stadium; Richmond, VA	LSN	W 21–16	5,121	
October 2	1:00 p.m.	Harvard*^{†}		Fisher Field; Easton, PA	LSN	L 23–38	5,365	
October 9	12:00 p.m.	at Columbia*		Wien Stadium; New York, NY	LSN	W 35–18	1,318	
October 16	1:00 p.m.	at Bucknell		Christy Mathewson–Memorial Stadium; Lewisburg, PA	LSN	W 14–13	3,026	
October 23	1:00 p.m.	at Fordham		Coffey Field; Bronx, NY	LSN	W 35–20	3,150	
November 6	12:30 p.m.	at No. 24 Colgate		Andy Kerr Stadium; Hamilton, NY	LSN	L 19–22	4,514	
November 13	12:30 p.m.	Holy Cross		Fisher Field; Easton, PA	LSN	W 56–20	4,543	
November 20	12:30 p.m.	No. 8 Lehigh		Fisher Field; Easton, PA (The Rivalry)	LSN	W 14–7	14,000	
November 27	3:00 p.m.	at No. 10 Delaware*	No. 25	Delaware Stadium; Newark, DE (NCAA Division I-AA First Round)	LSN, CN8, CSTV	L 14–28	13,707	
*Non-conference game; ^{†}Homecoming; Rankings from The Sports Network Poll released prior to the game; All times are in Eastern time
