= 2004 Brown Bears football team =

American college football season

2004 Brown Bears football
- Conference: Ivy League
- Record: 6–4 (3–4 Ivy)
- Head coach: Phil Estes (7th season)
- Offensive scheme: Pro-style
- Defensive coordinator: Michael Kelleher (4th season)
- Base defense: 4–3
- Captains: Will Burroughs; Anjel Gutierrez; L. Rubida
- Home stadium: Brown Stadium

2004 Ivy League football standings
	Conf.			Overall
Team	W		L	W		L
No. 13 Harvard $	7	–	0	10	–	0
No. 21 Penn	6	–	1	8	–	2
Cornell	4	–	3	4	–	6
Brown	3	–	4	6	–	4
Princeton	3	–	4	5	–	5
Yale	3	–	4	5	–	5
Dartmouth	1	–	6	1	–	9
Columbia	1	–	6	1	–	9
$ – Conference champion; Rankings from The Sports Network poll

The 2004 Brown Bears football team was an American football team that represented Brown University during the 2004 NCAA Division I-AA football season. Brown tied for fourth in the Ivy League.

In their seventh season under head coach Phil Estes, the Bears compiled a 6–4 record and outscored opponents 222 to 194. Will Burroughs, Anjel Gutierrez and L. Rubida were the team captains.

The Bears' 3–4 conference record placed them in a three-way tie for fourth place in the Ivy League standings. Brown was outscored 154 to 145 by Ivy opponents.

Brown played its home games at Brown Stadium in Providence, Rhode Island.

== Schedule ==
Date	Opponent	Site	Result	Attendance	Source
September 18	Albany*	Brown Stadium; Providence, RI	W 35–7	3,512	
September 25	Harvard	Brown Stadium; Providence, RI	L 34–35	9,278	
October 2	at Rhode Island*	Meade Stadium; Kingston, RI (rivalry)	W 20–13	3,551	
October 9	at Fordham*	Coffey Field; Bronx, NY	W 27–20 ^{OT}	4,950	
October 16	at Princeton	Princeton Stadium; Princeton, NJ	L 10–24	11,982	
October 23	Cornell	Brown Stadium; Providence, RI	W 21–17	9,310	
October 30	at No. 22 Penn	Franklin Field; Philadelphia, PA	L 16–20	12,314	
November 6	Yale	Brown Stadium; Providence, RI	W 24–17	6,212	
November 13	at Dartmouth	Memorial Field; Hanover, NH	L 7–20	4,113	
November 20	Columbia	Brown Stadium; Providence, RI	W 33–21	5,098	
*Non-conference game; Rankings from The Sports Network Poll released prior to the game
