= 2004 Dartmouth Big Green football team =

American college football season

2004 Dartmouth Big Green football
- Conference: Ivy League
- Record: 1–9 (1–6 Ivy)
- Head coach: John Lyons (13th season)
- Captains: Ryan Conger; Chris Dodds; Chris Little; Clayton Smith
- Home stadium: Memorial Field

2004 Ivy League football standings
	Conf.			Overall
Team	W		L	W		L
No. 13 Harvard $	7	–	0	10	–	0
No. 21 Penn	6	–	1	8	–	2
Cornell	4	–	3	4	–	6
Brown	3	–	4	6	–	4
Princeton	3	–	4	5	–	5
Yale	3	–	4	5	–	5
Dartmouth	1	–	6	1	–	9
Columbia	1	–	6	1	–	9
$ – Conference champion; Rankings from The Sports Network poll

The 2004 Dartmouth Big Green football team was an American football team that represented Dartmouth College during the 2004 NCAA Division I-AA football season. The Big Green tied for last in the Ivy League.

In its 13th and final season under head coach John Lyons, the team compiled a 1–9 record and was outscored 205 to 108. Ryan Conger, Chris Dodds, Chris Little and Clayton Smith were the team captains.

The Big Green's 1–6 conference record tied for sixth in the Ivy League standings. Dartmouth was outscored 200 to 151 by Ivy opponents.

Dartmouth played its home games at Memorial Field on the college campus in Hanover, New Hampshire.

== Schedule ==
Date	Opponent	Site	Result	Attendance	Source
September 18	at No. 12 Colgate*	Andy Kerr Stadium; Hamilton, NY	L 15–17	5,439	
September 25	No. 14 New Hampshire*	Memorial Field; Hanover, NH (rivalry)	L 24–45	4,925	
October 2	at Penn	Franklin Field; Philadelphia, PA	L 0–35	8,419	
October 9	Yale	Memorial Field; Hanover, NH	L 14–24	6,109	
October 16	Holy Cross*	Memorial Field; Hanover, NH	L 0–24	3,116	
October 23	at Columbia	Wien Stadium; New York, NY	L 6–9	4,140	
October 30	No. 21 Harvard^{†}	Memorial Field; Hanover, NH (rivalry)	L 12–13	6,030	
November 6	at Cornell	Schoellkopf Field; Ithaca, NY (rivalry)	L 7–14	5,012	
November 13	Brown	Memorial Field; Hanover, NH	W 20–7	4,113	
November 20	at Princeton	Princeton Stadium; Princeton, NJ	L 10–17	13,852	
*Non-conference game; ^{†}Homecoming; Rankings from The Sports Network Poll released prior to the game
