= 2004 Penn Quakers football team =

American college football season

2004 Penn Quakers football
- Conference: Ivy League
- Record: 8–2 (6–1 Ivy)
- Head coach: Al Bagnoli (13th season)
- Offensive coordinator: Andy Coen (5th season)
- Defensive coordinator: Ray Priore (7th season)
- Home stadium: Franklin Field

2004 Ivy League football standings
	Conf.			Overall
Team	W		L	W		L
No. 13 Harvard $	7	–	0	10	–	0
No. 21 Penn	6	–	1	8	–	2
Cornell	4	–	3	4	–	6
Brown	3	–	4	6	–	4
Princeton	3	–	4	5	–	5
Yale	3	–	4	5	–	5
Dartmouth	1	–	6	1	–	9
Columbia	1	–	6	1	–	9
$ – Conference champion; Rankings from The Sports Network poll

The 2004 Penn Quakers football team represented the University of Pennsylvania in the 2004 NCAA Division I-AA football season. It was the 128th season of play for the Quakers. They were led by 13th-year head coach Al Bagnoli and played their home games at Franklin Field. They finished the season 8–2 overall and 6–1 in conference play, placing second in the Ivy League.

== Schedule ==
Date	Time	Opponent	Rank	Site	TV	Result	Attendance	Source
September 18	4:00 p.m.	at San Diego*	No. 23	Torero Stadium; San Diego, CA		W 61–18	4,012	
September 25	7:00 p.m.	No. 11 Villanova*	No. 22	Franklin Field; Philadelphia, PA	CN8	L 13–16	16,572	
October 2	Noon	Dartmouth		Franklin Field; Philadelphia, PA	YES, DirecTV	W 35–0	8,419	
October 9	Noon	at Bucknell*		Mathewson Stadium; Lewisburg, PA		W 32–25 ^{2OT}	10,602	
October 16	1:00 p.m.	Columbia^{†}	No. 25	Franklin Field; Philadelphia, PA		W 14–3	13,422	
October 23	1:00 p.m.	at Yale	No. 21	Yale Bowl; New Haven, CT	CN8	W 17–7	17,737	
October 30	1:00 p.m.	Brown	No. 22	Franklin Field; Philadelphia, PA		W 20–16	12,314	
November 6	1:00 p.m.	at Princeton	No. 20	Princeton Stadium; Princeton, NJ (rivalry)	CSTV, DirecTV	W 16–15	15,891	
November 13	1:00 p.m.	No. 15 Harvard	No. 17	Franklin Field; Philadelphia, PA (rivalry)	CN8	L 10–31	15,123	
November 20	Noon	at Cornell	No. 22	Schoellkopf Field; Ithaca, NY (rivalry)	YES, DirecTV	W 20–14	4,242	
*Non-conference game; ^{†}Homecoming; Rankings from The Sports Network Poll released prior to the game; All times are in Eastern time
