= 2004 Columbia Lions football team =

American college football season

2004 Columbia Lions football
- Conference: Ivy League
- Record: 1–9 (1–6 Ivy)
- Head coach: Bob Shoop (2nd season)
- Captains: Rashad Biggers; Chuck Britton; Jeff Otis; Michael Quarshie
- Home stadium: Wien Stadium

2004 Ivy League football standings
	Conf.			Overall
Team	W		L	W		L
No. 13 Harvard $	7	–	0	10	–	0
No. 21 Penn	6	–	1	8	–	2
Cornell	4	–	3	4	–	6
Brown	3	–	4	6	–	4
Princeton	3	–	4	5	–	5
Yale	3	–	4	5	–	5
Dartmouth	1	–	6	1	–	9
Columbia	1	–	6	1	–	9
$ – Conference champion; Rankings from The Sports Network poll

The 2004 Columbia Lions football team was an American football team that represented Columbia University during the 2004 NCAA Division I-AA football season. Columbia tied for last in the Ivy League.

In their second season under head coach Bob Shoop, the Lions compiled a 1–9 record and were outscored 265 to 140. Rashad Biggers, Chuck Britton, Jeff Otis and Michael Quarshie were the team captains.

The Lions' 1–6 conference record tied for seventh place in the Ivy League standings. Columbia was outscored 171 to 99 by Ivy opponents. Columbia's only win was against fellow cellar-dweller Dartmouth.

Columbia played its homes games at Lawrence A. Wien Stadium in Upper Manhattan, in New York City.

== Schedule ==
Date	Opponent	Site	Result	Attendance	Source
September 18	Fordham*	Wien Stadium; New York, NY (Liberty Cup)	L 14–17	2,176	
September 25	at Bucknell*	Christy Mathewson–Memorial Stadium; Lewisburg, PA	L 13–42	8,233	
October 2	Princeton^{†}	Wien Stadium; New York, NY	L 26–27 ^{OT}	10,823	
October 9	Lafayette*	Wien Stadium; New York, NY	L 14–35	1,318	
October 16	at No. 25 Penn	Franklin Field; Philadelphia, PA	L 3–14	13,422	
October 23	Dartmouth	Wien Stadium; New York, NY	W 9–6	4,140	
October 30	at Yale	Yale Bowl; New Haven, CT	L 14–21	6,141	
November 6	at No. 16 Harvard	Harvard Stadium; Boston, MA	L 0–38	10,046	
November 13	Cornell	Wien Stadium; New York, NY (rivalry)	L 26–32	4,020	
November 20	at Brown	Brown Stadium; Providence, RI	L 21–33	5,098	
*Non-conference game; ^{†}Homecoming; Rankings from The Sports Network Poll released prior to the game
