= Richard Mannello =

American football coach

Rich Mannello
Current position
- Title: Head coach
- Team: Dallas HS (PA)
- Conference: PIAA District 2

Playing career
- 1979–1982: Springfield

Coaching career (HC unless noted)
- 1984–1988: Springfield (MA) (assistant)
- 1989–1990: Northeastern (assistant)
- 1991–2009: King's
- 2015–present: Dallas HS (PA)

Head coaching record
- Overall: 70–104–1 (college)
- Tournaments: 1–1 (NCAA D-III playoffs)

Accomplishments and honors

Championships
- 1 MAC (2002)

Richard Mannello is an American football coach. He served as the head football coach at King's College in Wilkes-Barre, Pennsylvania from 1991 to 2009, compiling a record of 70–104–1. He built the program from the ground up after the school had ended varsity football in the early 1960s.

After several years away from college coaching, Mannello returned to the sidelines in 2015 as the head coach at Dallas High School in Dallas, Pennsylvania.

== Head coaching record ==
=== College ===
Year	Team	Overall	Conference	Standing	Bowl/playoffs
King's Monarchs (Middle Atlantic Conference) (1993–2009)
1993	King's	1–9	0–5	6th (Freedom)	
1994	King's	2–6–1	1–3	T–4th (Freedom)	
1995	King's	1–9	1–3	T–4th (Freedom)	
1996	King's	2–8	1–3	T–3rd (Freedom)	
1997	King's	3–7	1–3	4th (Freedom)	
1998	King's	3–7	2–2	2nd (Freedom)	
1999	King's	5–5	1–3	4th (Freedom)	
2000	King's	7–4	3–1	2nd (Freedom)	
2001	King's	8–3	7–2	3rd	
2002	King's	9–3	8–1	1st	L NCAA Division III Second Round
2003	King's	7–4	6–3	T–4th	
2004	King's	4–6	4–5	6th	
2005	King's	5–5	5–4	T–4th	
2006	King's	6–5	6–3	T–3rd	
2007	King's	1–9	1–6	7th	
2008	King's	3–7	2–5	T–6th	
2009	King's	3–7	2–5	6th	
King's:		70–104–1	51–57		
Total:		70–104–1			
National championship Conference title Conference division title or championship game berth
