= Kevin Doherty (American football) =

American football coach

Current position
- Title: Defensive coordinator
- Team: Georgetown
- Conference: Patriot

Biographical details
- Education: Tufts (BA, 1987); Syracuse (MS, 1989)

Coaching career (HC unless noted)
- 1987–1988: Syracuse (GA)
- 1989–1991: Tufts (DB/ST)
- 1992–1997: Marist (DC/ST)
- 1998: Saint Francis (PA)
- 1999–2000: Connecticut (DB)
- 2001: Harvard (DB)
- 2002: Harvard (co-DC)
- 2003–2008: Harvard (AHC/DC)
- 2009–2011: Saint Anselm (DB/AHC)
- 2012–2016: Georgetown (DB/ST)
- 2017–2022: Georgetown (DC/LB)
- 2023–present: Georgetown (DC)

Head coaching record
- Overall: 0–10

Kevin Doherty is an American college football coach. He is the defensive coordinator coach at Georgetown University in Washington, D.C., a position he has held since the 2023 season. Doherty served as the head football coach at Saint Francis University in Loretto, Pennsylvania for one season, in 1998, compiling a record of 0–10.

== Head coaching record ==
Year	Team	Overall	Conference	Standing	Bowl/playoffs
Saint Francis Red Flash (Northeast Conference) (1998)
1998	Saint Francis	0–10	0–5	6th	
Saint Francis:		0–10	0–5		
Total:		0–10			
