= Tim Murphy (American football) =

American football player and coach (born 1956)

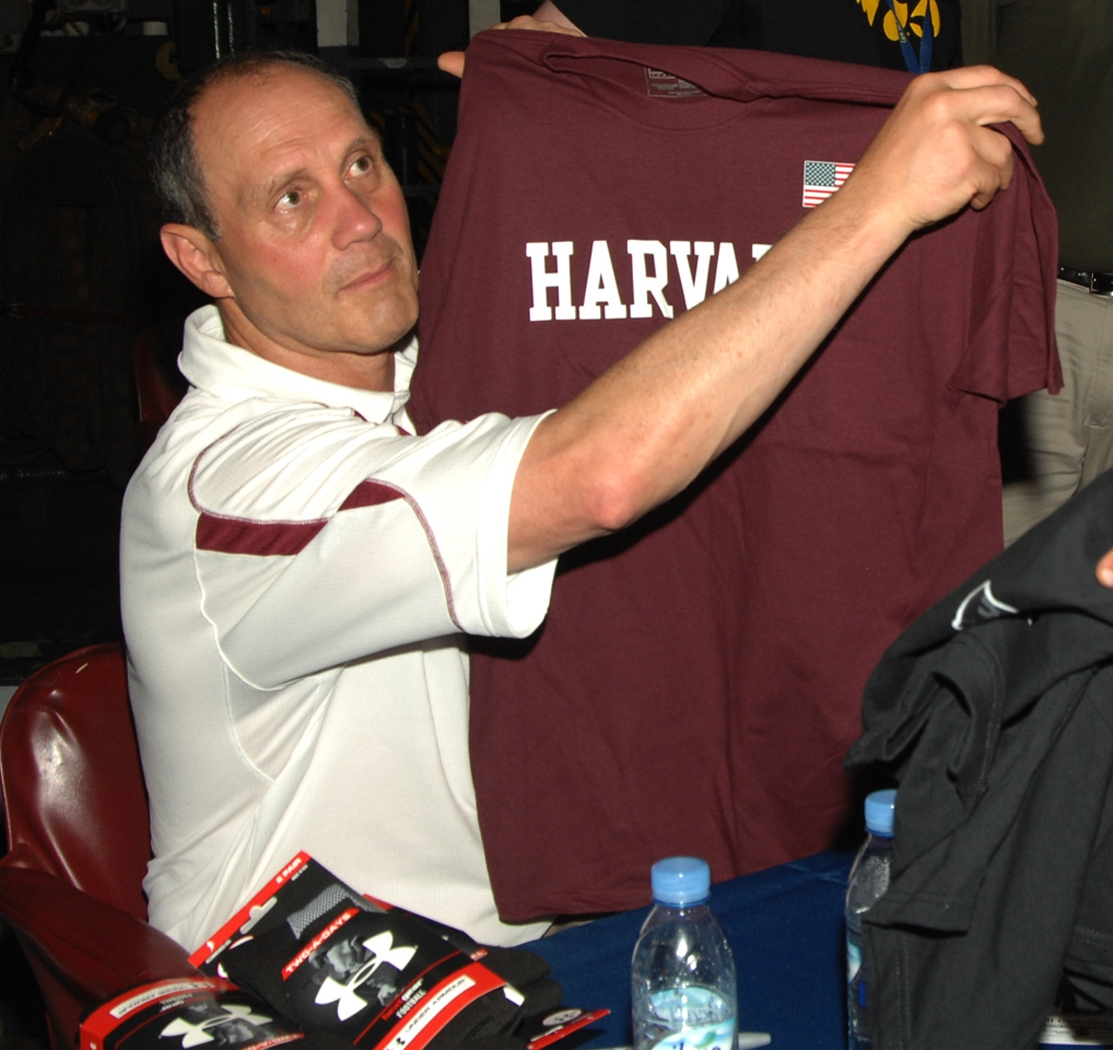
- Murphy on board the USS Dwight D. Eisenhower in May 2010

Biographical details
- Born: October 9, 1956 (age 70); Kingston, Massachusetts, U.S.

Playing career
- 1974–1977: Springfield
- Position: Linebacker

Coaching career (HC unless noted)
- 1979: Brown (part-time assistant)
- 1980: Brown (assistant OL)
- 1981: Lafayette (OL)
- 1982–1984: Boston University (OL)
- 1985–1986: Maine (OC)
- 1987–1988: Maine
- 1989–1993: Cincinnati
- 1994–2023: Harvard

Head coaching record
- Overall: 232–134–1
- Tournaments: 0–1 (NCAA D-I-AA playoffs)

Accomplishments and honors

Championships
- 1 Yankee (1987); 10 Ivy (1997, 2001, 2004, 2007–2008, 2011, 2013–2015, 2023)

Timothy Lester Murphy (born October 9, 1956) is an American former college football coach and player. He was the head football coach at Harvard University from 1994 to 2023. Murphy served as the head coach at the University of Maine from 1987 to 1988 and the University of Cincinnati from 1989 to 1993.

== Career ==
Under Murphy, the Harvard Crimson football program had enjoyed 16 consecutive winning seasons, from 2001 to 2016. His 2004 Harvard Crimson football team went 10–0 and was the only undefeated team during the 2004 NCAA Division I-AA football season. His 2014 Harvard team repeated the feat, again going 10–0 and achieving the only perfect mark during the 2014 NCAA Division I FCS football season.

In 2012, Murphy was elected president of the American Football Coaches Association.

== Head coaching record ==
Year	Team	Overall	Conference	Standing	Bowl/playoffs	NCAA/TSN/STATS^{#}	Coaches^{°}
Maine Black Bears (Yankee Conference) (1987–1988)
1987	Maine	8–4	6–1	T–1st	L NCAA Division I-AA First Round	13	
1988	Maine	7–4	4–4	T–3rd			
Maine:		15–8	10–5				
Cincinnati Bearcats (NCAA Division I-A independent) (1989–1993)
1989	Cincinnati	1–9–1					
1990	Cincinnati	1–10					
1991	Cincinnati	4–7					
1992	Cincinnati	3–8					
1993	Cincinnati	8–3					
Cincinnati:		17–37–1					
Harvard Crimson (Ivy League) (1994–2023)
1994	Harvard	4–6	2–5	T–7th			
1995	Harvard	2–8	1–6	8th			
1996	Harvard	4–6	2–5	T–6th			
1997	Harvard	9–1	7–0	1st			
1998	Harvard	4–6	3–4	T–5th			
1999	Harvard	5–5	3–4	5th			
2000	Harvard	5–5	4–3	T–3rd			
2001	Harvard	9–0	7–0	1st		19	
2002	Harvard	7–3	6–1	2nd			
2003	Harvard	7–3	4–3	T–2nd			
2004	Harvard	10–0	7–0	1st		13	
2005	Harvard	7–3	5–2	T–2nd			
2006	Harvard	7–3	4–3	3rd			
2007	Harvard	8–2	7–0	1st		21	
2008	Harvard	9–1	6–1	T–1st		15	
2009	Harvard	7–3	6–1	2nd			
2010	Harvard	7–3	5–2	T–2nd			
2011	Harvard	9–1	7–0	1st		16	14
2012	Harvard	8–2	5–2	2nd			23
2013	Harvard	9–1	6–1	T–1st			23
2014	Harvard	10–0	7–0	1st		15	15
2015	Harvard	9–1	6–1	T–1st		20	20
2016	Harvard	7–3	5–2	3rd			
2017	Harvard	5–5	3–4	T–5th			
2018	Harvard	6–4	4–3	3rd			
2019	Harvard	4–6	2–5	T–6th			
2020–21	No team—COVID-19						
2021	Harvard	8–2	5–2	3rd			
2022	Harvard	6–4	4–3	4th			
2023	Harvard	8–2	5–2	T–1st			
Harvard:		200–89	138–65				
Total:		232–134–1					
National championship Conference title Conference division title or championship game berth

== See also ==
- List of college football career coaching wins leaders
