= 2013 UTEP Miners football team =

American college football season

2013 UTEP Miners football
- Conference: Conference USA
- West Division
- Record: 2–10 (1–7 C-USA)
- Head coach: Sean Kugler (1st season)
- Offensive coordinator: Patrick Higgins (1st season)
- Offensive scheme: Pro spread
- Defensive coordinator: Scott Stoker (1st season)
- Base defense: 3–3–5
- Home stadium: Sun Bowl

2013 Conference USA football standings
| | Conf. | | | Overall |
| Team | W | | L | W | | L |
|---|---|---|---|---|---|---|
East Division
| Marshall x | 7 | – | 1 | 10 | – | 4 |
| East Carolina | 6 | – | 2 | 10 | – | 3 |
| Middle Tennessee | 6 | – | 2 | 8 | – | 5 |
| Florida Atlantic | 4 | – | 4 | 6 | – | 6 |
| UAB | 1 | – | 7 | 2 | – | 10 |
| Southern Miss | 1 | – | 7 | 1 | – | 11 |
| FIU | 1 | – | 7 | 1 | – | 11 |
West Division
| Rice x$ | 7 | – | 1 | 10 | – | 4 |
| UTSA | 6 | – | 2 | 7 | – | 5 |
| North Texas | 6 | – | 2 | 9 | – | 4 |
| Tulane | 5 | – | 3 | 7 | – | 6 |
| Louisiana Tech | 3 | – | 5 | 4 | – | 8 |
| Tulsa | 2 | – | 6 | 3 | – | 9 |
| UTEP | 1 | – | 7 | 2 | – | 10 |
Championship: Rice 41, Marshall 24
$ – Conference champion; x – Division champion/co-champions; Rankings from AP Poll

The 2013 UTEP Miners football team represented the University of Texas at El Paso (UTEP) as a member of the West Division in Conference USA (C-USA) during the 2013 NCAA Division I FCS football season. Led by first-year head coach Sean Kugler, the Miners compiled an overall record of 2–10 with a mark of 1–7 in conference play, placing last out of six teams in C-USA's West Division. The team played home games at the Sun Bowl in El Paso, Texas.

Kugler replaced Mike Price, who retired after nine seasons with the Miners. UTEP averaged 28,375 fans per game.

== Schedule ==
| Date | Time | Opponent | Site | TV | Result | Attendance |
|---|---|---|---|---|---|---|
| September 7 | 6:00 pm | New Mexico* | Sun Bowl; El Paso, TX | FCS | L 35–42 ^{OT} | 34,907 |
| September 14 | 6:00 pm | at New Mexico State* | Aggie Memorial Stadium; Las Cruces, NM (Battle of I-10) | AV | W 42–21 | 18,366 |
| September 21 | 6:00 pm | UTSA | Sun Bowl; El Paso, TX | FCS | L 13–32 | 30,004 |
| September 28 | 1:30 pm | at Colorado State* | Hughes Stadium; Fort Collins, CO | CBSSN | L 42–59 | 19,517 |
| October 5 | 5:30 pm | Louisiana Tech^{†} | Sun Bowl; El Paso, TX | CBSSN | L 35–38 | 24,926 |
| October 12 | 6:00 pm | Tulsa | Sun Bowl; El Paso, TX | FS1 | L 20–34 | 22,158 |
| October 26 | 1:30 pm | at Rice | Rice Stadium; Houston, TX | CSS | L 7–45 | 15,355 |
| November 2 | 7:00 pm | at No. 12 Texas A&M* | Kyle Field; College Station, TX | ESPN2 | L 7–57 | 87,126 |
| November 9 | 1:30 pm | at North Texas | Apogee Stadium; Denton, TX | CSS, TWCS | L 7–41 | 26,119 |
| November 16 | 7:00 pm | FIU | Sun Bowl Stadium; El Paso, TX | | W 33–10 | 29,882 |
| November 23 | 1:30 pm | at Tulane | Mercedes-Benz Superdome; New Orleans, LA | KVIA | L 3–45 | 19,771 |
| November 30 | 1:45 pm | at Middle Tennessee | Johnny "Red" Floyd Stadium; Murfreesboro, TN | WUXP | L 17–48 | 11,560 |
*Non-conference game; ^{†}Homecoming; Rankings from AP Poll released prior to the game; All times are in Mountain time

== Game summaries ==
=== New Mexico ===
| | 1 | 2 | 3 | 4 | OT | Total |
|---|---|---|---|---|---|---|
| Lobos | 7 | 14 | 0 | 14 | 7 | 42 |
| Miners | 0 | 21 | 7 | 7 | 0 | 35 |

| Statistics | UNM | UTEP |
|---|---|---|
| First downs | 25 | 23 |
| Total yards | 483 | 402 |
| Rushing yards | 395 | 283 |
| Passing yards | 88 | 119 |
| Turnovers | 1 | 0 |
| Time of possession | 31:33 | 28:27 |

| Team | Category | Player | Statistics |
|---|---|---|---|
| New Mexico | Passing | Clayton Mitchem | 4/7, 88 yards |
| New Mexico | Rushing | Kasey Carrier | 41 rushes, 291 yards, 4 TD |
| New Mexico | Receiving | Jhurell Pressley | 2 receptions, 52 yards |
| UTEP | Passing | Jameill Showers | 15/20, 119 yards, TD |
| UTEP | Rushing | Aaron Jones | 11 rushes, 127 yards, 2 TD |
| UTEP | Receiving | Ian Hamilton | 4 receptions, 42 yards |

=== At New Mexico State ===
| | 1 | 2 | 3 | 4 | Total |
|---|---|---|---|---|---|
| Miners | 14 | 7 | 7 | 14 | 42 |
| Aggies | 14 | 0 | 7 | 0 | 21 |

| Statistics | UTEP | NMSU |
|---|---|---|
| First downs | 29 | 15 |
| Total yards | 546 | 398 |
| Rushing yards | 293 | 99 |
| Passing yards | 253 | 299 |
| Turnovers | 2 | 4 |
| Time of possession | 41:36 | 18:24 |

| Team | Category | Player | Statistics |
|---|---|---|---|
| UTEP | Passing | Jameill Showers | 18/28, 253 yards, TD, INT |
| UTEP | Rushing | Aaron Jones | 22 rushes, 97 yards, TD |
| UTEP | Receiving | Jordan Leslie | 7 receptions, 103 yards |
| New Mexico State | Passing | Andrew McDonald | 7/11, 156 yards, 2 TD, INT |
| New Mexico State | Rushing | Germi Morrison | 8 rushes, 48 yards |
| New Mexico State | Receiving | Jerrel Brown | 1 reception, 81 yards, TD |

=== UTSA ===
| | 1 | 2 | 3 | 4 | Total |
|---|---|---|---|---|---|
| Roadrunners | 7 | 18 | 0 | 7 | 32 |
| Miners | 10 | 0 | 3 | 0 | 13 |

| Statistics | UTSA | UTEP |
|---|---|---|
| First downs | 19 | 13 |
| Total yards | 385 | 218 |
| Rushing yards | 181 | 99 |
| Passing yards | 204 | 119 |
| Turnovers | 0 | 0 |
| Time of possession | 33:53 | 26:07 |

| Team | Category | Player | Statistics |
|---|---|---|---|
| UTSA | Passing | Eric Soza | 18/24, 204 yards, TD |
| UTSA | Rushing | David Glasco II | 10 rushes, 52 yards, TD |
| UTSA | Receiving | Brandon Freeman | 1 reception, 53 yards |
| UTEP | Passing | Jameill Showers | 17/31, 119 yards |
| UTEP | Rushing | Autrey Golden | 6 rushes, 39 yards |
| UTEP | Receiving | Eric Tomlinson | 4 receptions, 30 yards |

=== At Colorado State ===
| | 1 | 2 | 3 | 4 | Total |
|---|---|---|---|---|---|
| Miners | 7 | 0 | 21 | 14 | 42 |
| Rams | 14 | 14 | 9 | 22 | 59 |

| Statistics | UTEP | CSU |
|---|---|---|
| First downs | 28 | 25 |
| Total yards | 497 | 591 |
| Rushing yards | 132 | 250 |
| Passing yards | 365 | 341 |
| Turnovers | 1 | 1 |
| Time of possession | 35:10 | 24:50 |

| Team | Category | Player | Statistics |
|---|---|---|---|
| UTEP | Passing | Jameill Showers | 26/43, 365 yards, 5 TD |
| UTEP | Rushing | Aaron Jones | 23 rushes, 94 yards |
| UTEP | Receiving | Jordan Leslie | 3 receptions, 130 yards, 2 TD |
| Colorado State | Passing | Garrett Grayson | 17/28, 307 yards, 3 TD |
| Colorado State | Rushing | Kapri Bibbs | 13 rushes, 147 yards, 3 TD |
| Colorado State | Receiving | Rashard Higgins | 6 receptions, 156 yards, 2 TD |

=== Louisiana Tech ===
| | 1 | 2 | 3 | 4 | Total |
|---|---|---|---|---|---|
| Bulldogs | 14 | 10 | 7 | 7 | 38 |
| Miners | 7 | 7 | 14 | 7 | 35 |

| Statistics | LT | UTEP |
|---|---|---|
| First downs | 24 | 22 |
| Total yards | 463 | 440 |
| Rushing yards | 353 | 203 |
| Passing yards | 110 | 237 |
| Turnovers | 2 | 1 |
| Time of possession | 29:42 | 30:18 |

| Team | Category | Player | Statistics |
|---|---|---|---|
| Louisiana Tech | Passing | Ryan Higgins | 10/18, 110 yards |
| Louisiana Tech | Rushing | Kenneth Dixon | 25 rushes, 200 yards, TD |
| Louisiana Tech | Receiving | Trent Taylor | 2 receptions, 29 yards |
| UTEP | Passing | Jameill Showers | 18/33, 237 yards, 3 TD, INT |
| UTEP | Rushing | Aaron Jones | 18 rushes, 121 yards |
| UTEP | Receiving | Jordan Leslie | 5 receptions, 114 yards, 2 TD |

=== Tulsa ===
| | 1 | 2 | 3 | 4 | Total |
|---|---|---|---|---|---|
| Golden Hurricane | 14 | 7 | 6 | 7 | 34 |
| Miners | 3 | 3 | 14 | 0 | 20 |

| Statistics | TLSA | UTEP |
|---|---|---|
| First downs | 22 | 20 |
| Total yards | 430 | 388 |
| Rushing yards | 204 | 222 |
| Passing yards | 226 | 166 |
| Turnovers | 1 | 2 |
| Time of possession | 30:06 | 29:54 |

| Team | Category | Player | Statistics |
|---|---|---|---|
| Tulsa | Passing | Cody Green | 14/17, 226 yards, 2 TD |
| Tulsa | Rushing | Trey Watts | 27 rushes, 142 yards |
| Tulsa | Receiving | Thomas Roberson | 5 receptions, 105 yards, TD |
| UTEP | Passing | Jameill Showers | 12/30, 166 yards, TD, 2 INT |
| UTEP | Rushing | Aaron Jones | 15 rushes, 90 yards |
| UTEP | Receiving | Jordan Leslie | 4 receptions, 102 yards, TD |

=== At Rice ===
| | 1 | 2 | 3 | 4 | Total |
|---|---|---|---|---|---|
| Miners | 0 | 7 | 0 | 0 | 7 |
| Owls | 3 | 21 | 7 | 14 | 45 |

| Statistics | UTEP | RICE |
|---|---|---|
| First downs | 17 | 21 |
| Total yards | 364 | 524 |
| Rushing yards | 248 | 265 |
| Passing yards | 116 | 259 |
| Turnovers | 3 | 0 |
| Time of possession | 32:30 | 27:30 |

| Team | Category | Player | Statistics |
|---|---|---|---|
| UTEP | Passing | Blaire Sullivan | 6/9, 112 yards, TD, INT |
| UTEP | Rushing | Aaron Jones | 29 rushes, 186 yards |
| UTEP | Receiving | Ian Hamilton | 4 receptions 108 yards, TD |
| Rice | Passing | Taylor McHargue | 8/19, 259 yards, 4 TD |
| Rice | Rushing | Charles Ross | 21 rushes, 152 yards, TD |
| Rice | Receiving | Jordan Taylor | 4 receptions, 185 yards, 3 TD |

=== At No. 12 Texas A&M ===
| | 1 | 2 | 3 | 4 | Total |
|---|---|---|---|---|---|
| Miners | 7 | 0 | 0 | 0 | 7 |
| No. 12 Aggies | 9 | 27 | 21 | 0 | 57 |

| Statistics | UTEP | TAMU |
|---|---|---|
| First downs | 10 | 25 |
| Total yards | 198 | 564 |
| Rushing yards | 127 | 234 |
| Passing yards | 71 | 330 |
| Turnovers | 4 | 1 |
| Time of possession | 36:06 | 23:54 |

| Team | Category | Player | Statistics |
|---|---|---|---|
| UTEP | Passing | Brian Sullivan | 9/17, 71 yards, 3 INT |
| UTEP | Rushing | Aaron Jones | 22 rushes, 62 yards, TD |
| UTEP | Receiving | Devin Patterson | 1 reception, 32 yards |
| Texas A&M | Passing | Johnny Manziel | 16/24, 273 yards, 4 TD |
| Texas A&M | Rushing | Johnny Manziel | 7 rushes, 67 yards, 2 TD |
| Texas A&M | Receiving | Travis Labhart | 4 receptions, 83 yards, 2 TD |

=== At North Texas ===
| | 1 | 2 | 3 | 4 | Total |
|---|---|---|---|---|---|
| Miners | 0 | 0 | 7 | 0 | 7 |
| Mean Green | 14 | 7 | 7 | 13 | 41 |

| Statistics | UTEP | UNT |
|---|---|---|
| First downs | 13 | 22 |
| Total yards | 184 | 471 |
| Rushing yards | 56 | 317 |
| Passing yards | 128 | 154 |
| Turnovers | 1 | 0 |
| Time of possession | 33:06 | 26:54 |

| Team | Category | Player | Statistics |
|---|---|---|---|
| UTEP | Passing | Mack Leftwich | 14/20, 128 yards, TD, INT |
| UTEP | Rushing | LaQuintus Dowell | 6 rushes, 28 yards |
| UTEP | Receiving | Jordan Leslie | 5 receptions, 41 yards, TD |
| North Texas | Passing | Derek Thompson | 10/24, 154 yards, TD |
| North Texas | Rushing | Brandin Byrd | 18 rushes, 202 yards, 2 TD |
| North Texas | Receiving | Drew Miller | 3 receptions, 44 yards |

=== FIU ===
| | 1 | 2 | 3 | 4 | Total |
|---|---|---|---|---|---|
| Panthers | 7 | 0 | 0 | 3 | 10 |
| Miners | 10 | 7 | 9 | 7 | 33 |

| Statistics | FIU | UTEP |
|---|---|---|
| First downs | 11 | 16 |
| Total yards | 200 | 407 |
| Rushing yards | 95 | 327 |
| Passing yards | 105 | 80 |
| Turnovers | 1 | 0 |
| Time of possession | 25:33 | 34:27 |

| Team | Category | Player | Statistics |
|---|---|---|---|
| FIU | Passing | E. J. Hilliard | 5/14, 53 yards |
| FIU | Rushing | Lamarq Caldwell | 20 rushes, 95 yards |
| FIU | Receiving | Dominique Rhymes | 2 receptions, 44 yards |
| UTEP | Passing | Mack Leftwich | 3/7, 80 yards, TD |
| UTEP | Rushing | Nate Jeffrey | 25 rushes, 130 yards, 2 TD |
| UTEP | Receiving | Jordan Leslie | 1 reception, 64 yards, TD |

=== At Tulane ===
| | 1 | 2 | 3 | 4 | Total |
|---|---|---|---|---|---|
| Miners | 0 | 3 | 0 | 0 | 3 |
| Green Wave | 14 | 24 | 7 | 0 | 45 |

| Statistics | UTEP | TULN |
|---|---|---|
| First downs | 13 | 26 |
| Total yards | 232 | 482 |
| Rushing yards | 49 | 277 |
| Passing yards | 183 | 205 |
| Turnovers | 3 | 0 |
| Time of possession | 29:07 | 30:53 |

| Team | Category | Player | Statistics |
|---|---|---|---|
| UTEP | Passing | Mack Leftwich | 13/24, 128 yards, INT |
| UTEP | Rushing | Nate Jeffery | 14 rushes, 47 yards |
| UTEP | Receiving | Eric Tomlinson | 4 receptions, 71 yards |
| Tulane | Passing | Nick Montana | 12/19, 171 yards, 3 TD |
| Tulane | Rushing | Orleans Darkwa | 17 rushes, 137 yards, TD |
| Tulane | Receiving | Ryan Grant | 8 receptions, 104 yards, 2 TD |

=== At Middle Tennessee ===
| | 1 | 2 | 3 | 4 | Total |
|---|---|---|---|---|---|
| Miners | 0 | 7 | 10 | 0 | 17 |
| Blue Raiders | 17 | 17 | 14 | 0 | 48 |

| Statistics | UTEP | MTSU |
|---|---|---|
| First downs | 14 | 27 |
| Total yards | 299 | 629 |
| Rushing yards | 177 | 304 |
| Passing yards | 122 | 325 |
| Turnovers | 1 | 1 |
| Time of possession | 28:48 | 31:12 |

| Team | Category | Player | Statistics |
|---|---|---|---|
| UTEP | Passing | Mack Leftwich | 14/24, 122 yards |
| UTEP | Rushing | Nate Jeffery | 20 rushes, 140 yards, 2 TD |
| UTEP | Receiving | Craig Wenreck | 2 receptions, 50 yards |
| Middle Tennessee | Passing | Logan Kilgore | 19/27, 325 yards, 2 TD, INT |
| Middle Tennessee | Rushing | Jeremiah Bryson | 15 rushes, 120 yards, 2 TD |
| Middle Tennessee | Receiving | Kyle Griswould | 5 receptions, 101 yards |
