= 2013 Conference USA football season =

- League: NCAA Division I Football Bowl Subdivision
- Sport: Football
- Duration: August 29, 2013 through January 1, 2014
- Teams: 14
- TV partner(s): Fox Sports, CBS Sports Network, ESPN, CSS, CST

2014 NFL Draft
- Top draft pick: DT Khyri Thornton, USM
- Picked by: Green Bay Packers, 85th overall

Regular Season
- Season MVP: QB Shane Carden, ECU
- East champions: Marshall
- West champions: Rice

Championship Game
- Champions: Rice
- Runners-up: Marshall
- Finals MVP: RB Luke Turner, Rice

Football seasons
- 2012 2014

2013 Conference USA football standings
	Conf.			Overall
Team	W		L	W		L
East Division
Marshall x	7	–	1	10	–	4
East Carolina	6	–	2	10	–	3
Middle Tennessee	6	–	2	8	–	5
Florida Atlantic	4	–	4	6	–	6
UAB	1	–	7	2	–	10
Southern Miss	1	–	7	1	–	11
FIU	1	–	7	1	–	11
West Division
Rice x$	7	–	1	10	–	4
UTSA	6	–	2	7	–	5
North Texas	6	–	2	9	–	4
Tulane	5	–	3	7	–	6
Louisiana Tech	3	–	5	4	–	8
Tulsa	2	–	6	3	–	9
UTEP	1	–	7	2	–	10
Championship: Rice 41, Marshall 24
$ – Conference champion; x – Division champion/co-champions; Rankings from AP Poll

The 2013 Conference USA football season is an NCAA football season that was played from August 2013 through January 2014. The 2013 football season marked the 19th season of the conference's existence and 18th of football competition; although C-USA was established in 1995, it did not begin football competition until 1996.

== 2013 season ==
Conference USA added several new members this season after losing four.

In preseason polls, Tulsa was projected to be top of the 2013 season followed by East Carolina.

=== East Division ===
Projected as the winner of the East Division, East Carolina lost its first conference game of the season to Tulane in triple overtime, 36-33. Marshall then topped the standings until they lost 51-49 to new member Middle Tennessee, which returned East Carolina to the top spot. Until the East Carolina–Marshall game at the end of the season, East Carolina was number one followed by Marshall. Whoever ended up winning the game would then be crowned winners of the East Division. Marshall defeated East Carolina 59–28 to earn the division title.

=== West Division ===
As Tulsa was projected to be number one in conference, the team lost their first conference play against Rice in overtime bringing Tulane on top of the western division standings. Tulane became up-top with a conference record of 4–0 after close wins against North Texas, East Carolina, and Tulsa. Tulane then lost their first conference game of the season to Florida Atlantic in early November bringing new member North Texas to the top of the division after North Texas defeated Rice. Projected in being last in the division, UTSA defeated Tulane and North Texas in November, which brought UTSA second in the standings after Rice being brought up to first. At the end of the season, Rice had to defeat Tulane in order to be crown the winners of the west division or Tulane or UTSA would have then been crowned winners of the division. Rice defeated Tulane 17–13 and crowned winners of the West Division for the first time and their first appearance in the championship game as well.

=== Championship Game ===
After the 2013 season, the ninth C-USA championship game was played in Houston, Texas, for the third time since 2011, when former member Houston Cougars hosted the Southern Miss Golden Eagles at Robertson Stadium. It was the first time that Rice Stadium would host the Championship game series after Rice won the West Division. Both Rice and Marshall enter the game with 7-1 conference records. Rice was crowned Conference USA Champion for the first time ever after defeating Marshall by 17–points. Rice represented the conference in the 2013 Liberty Bowl in Memphis, Tennessee against the Mississippi State Bulldogs, a 44-7 loss for Rice.

=== Bowl season ===
Eight teams earned bowl eligibility during the season, but UTSA is still transiting into the FBS level and will not be eligible for bowl games until after the 2014 season.

(C-USA teams in italic and winning teams in bold)

Bowl Game	Date	Stadium	City	Television	Time (EST)	Away team	Home team	Score	Attendance
New Orleans Bowl	December 21, 2013	Mercedes-Benz Superdome	New Orleans, LA	ESPN	9:00 p.m.	Tulane	**Louisiana–Lafayette**	21–24	54,728
Beef 'O' Brady's Bowl	December 23, 2013	Tropicana Field	St. Petersburg, FL	ESPN	2:00 p.m.	Ohio	**East Carolina**	20–37	20,053
Military Bowl	December 27, 2013	Navy–Marine Corps Memorial Stadium	Annapolis, MD	ESPN	2:30 p.m.	**Marshall**	Maryland	31–20	30,163
Armed Forces Bowl	December 30, 2013	Amon G. Carter Stadium	Fort Worth, TX	ESPN	11:45 a.m.	Middle Tennessee	**Navy**	6–24	39,246
Liberty Bowl	December 31, 2013	Liberty Bowl	Memphis, TN	ESPN	4:00 p.m.	Rice	**Mississippi State**	7–44	57,846
Heart of Dallas Bowl	January 1, 2014	Cotton Bowl	Dallas, TX	ESPNU	12:00 p.m.	UNLV	**North Texas**	14–36	38,380

==== Other bowl eligible teams ====
- **Florida Atlantic** (6-6) became bowl eligible on November 29 after defeating FIU but did not get a bid to a bowl game.

== Membership ==
Houston, Memphis, SMU and UCF left Conference USA, and joined the American Athletic Conference, the football-sponsoring offshoot of the original Big East, on July 1, 2013.

Louisiana Tech and UTSA joined C-USA from the WAC. Florida Atlantic, FIU, Middle Tennessee, and North Texas joined C-USA from the Sun Belt. Old Dominion, which had moved five of its sports from its former home of the Colonial Athletic Association to C-USA for the 2012–13 school year, moved the rest of its athletic program to C-USA. ODU had an established FCS program that played as an FCS independent in 2013, joined C-USA football as a provisional FBS member in 2014, and became fully bowl-eligible in 2015. Charlotte, which was starting a football team this season, was initially an FCS independent before becoming a provisional FBS member in 2014 and a C-USA football member in 2015. The 49ers joined from the Atlantic 10 Conference.

East Division	West Division
East Carolina	Louisiana Tech
Florida Atlantic	North Texas
Florida International	Rice
Marshall	Tulane
Middle Tennessee	Tulsa
Southern Miss	UTEP
UAB	UTSA

After the 2013 football season East Carolina, Tulane, and Tulsa moved to The American on July 1, 2014, at the start of the 2014 football season. On the same day, Western Kentucky joined C-USA from the Sun Belt.

== Rankings ==
Legend
	Improvement in ranking
	Drop in ranking
	Not ranked previous week
RV	Received votes but were not ranked in Top 25 of poll

Ranking Movement
		Pre	Wk 1	Wk 2	Wk 3	Wk 4	Wk 5	Wk 6	Wk 7	Wk 8	Wk 9	Wk 10	Wk 11	Wk 12	Wk 13	Wk 14	Final
East Carolina Pirates	AP	NR	NR	NR	NR	NR	NR	NR	NR	NR	NR	NR	NR	NR	RV		
East Carolina Pirates	C	RV	RV	RV	NR	NR	NR	NR	NR	NR	NR	NR	NR	RV	RV		
East Carolina Pirates	HAR	Not released							NR	NR	NR	NR	NR	RV	RV		
East Carolina Pirates	BCS	Not released															
Florida Atlantic Owls	AP	NR	NR	NR	NR	NR	NR	NR	NR	NR	NR	NR	NR	NR	NR		
Florida Atlantic Owls	C	NR	NR	NR	NR	NR	NR	NR	NR	NR	NR	NR	NR	NR	NR		
Florida Atlantic Owls	HAR	Not released							NR	NR	NR	NR	NR	NR	NR		
Florida Atlantic Owls	BCS	Not released															
FIU Panthers	AP	NR	NR	NR	NR	NR	NR	NR	NR	NR	NR	NR	NR	NR	NR		
FIU Panthers	C	NR	NR	NR	NR	NR	NR	NR	NR	NR	NR	NR	NR	NR	NR		
FIU Panthers	HAR	Not released							NR	NR	NR	NR	NR	NR	NR		
FIU Panthers	BCS	Not released															
Louisiana Tech Bulldogs	AP	NR	NR	NR	NR	NR	NR	NR	NR	NR	NR	NR	NR	NR	NR		
Louisiana Tech Bulldogs	C	NR	NR	NR	NR	NR	NR	NR	NR	NR	NR	NR	NR	NR	NR		
Louisiana Tech Bulldogs	HAR	Not released							NR	NR	NR	NR	NR	NR	NR		
Louisiana Tech Bulldogs	BCS	Not released															
Marshall Thundering Herd	AP	NR	NR	NR	NR	NR	NR	NR	NR	NR	NR	NR	NR	NR	NR		
Marshall Thundering Herd	C	NR	NR	NR	NR	NR	NR	NR	NR	NR	NR	NR	NR	NR	NR		
Marshall Thundering Herd	HAR	Not released							NR	NR	NR	NR	NR	NR	NR		
Marshall Thundering Herd	BCS	Not released															
Middle Tennessee Blue Raiders	AP	NR	NR	NR	NR	NR	NR	NR	NR	NR	NR	NR	NR	NR	NR		
Middle Tennessee Blue Raiders	C	NR	NR	NR	NR	NR	NR	NR	NR	NR	NR	NR	NR	NR	NR		
Middle Tennessee Blue Raiders	HAR	Not released							NR	NR	NR	NR	NR	NR	NR		
Middle Tennessee Blue Raiders	BCS	Not released															
North Texas Mean Green	AP	NR	NR	NR	NR	NR	NR	NR	NR	NR	NR	NR	NR	NR	NR		
North Texas Mean Green	C	NR	NR	NR	NR	NR	NR	NR	NR	NR	NR	NR	NR	NR	NR		
North Texas Mean Green	HAR	Not released							NR	NR	NR	NR	NR	NR	NR		
North Texas Mean Green	BCS	Not released															
Rice Owls	AP	NR	NR	NR	NR	NR	NR	NR	NR	NR	NR	NR	NR	NR	NR		
Rice Owls	C	NR	NR	NR	NR	NR	NR	NR	NR	NR	NR	NR	NR	NR	NR		
Rice Owls	HAR	Not released							NR	NR	NR	NR	NR	NR	NR		
Rice Owls	BCS	Not released															
Southern Miss Golden Eagles	AP	NR	NR	NR	NR	NR	NR	NR	NR	NR	NR	NR	NR	NR	NR		
Southern Miss Golden Eagles	C	NR	NR	NR	NR	NR	NR	NR	NR	NR	NR	NR	NR	NR	NR		
Southern Miss Golden Eagles	HAR	Not released							NR	NR	NR	NR	NR	NR	NR		
Southern Miss Golden Eagles	BCS	Not released															
Tulane Green Wave	AP	NR	NR	NR	NR	NR	NR	NR	NR	NR	NR	NR	NR	NR	NR		
Tulane Green Wave	C	NR	NR	NR	NR	NR	NR	NR	NR	NR	NR	NR	NR	NR	NR		
Tulane Green Wave	HAR	Not released							NR	NR	NR	NR	NR	NR	NR		
Tulane Green Wave	BCS	Not released															
Tulsa Golden Hurricane	AP	NR	NR	NR	NR	NR	NR	NR	NR	NR	NR	NR	NR	NR	NR		
Tulsa Golden Hurricane	C	RV	NR	NR	NR	NR	NR	NR	NR	NR	NR	NR	NR	NR	NR		
Tulsa Golden Hurricane	HAR	Not released							NR	NR	NR	NR	NR	NR	NR		
Tulsa Golden Hurricane	BCS	Not released															
UAB Blazers	AP	NR	NR	NR	NR	NR	NR	NR	NR	NR	NR	NR	NR	NR	NR		
UAB Blazers	C	NR	NR	NR	NR	NR	NR	NR	NR	NR	NR	NR	NR	NR	NR		
UAB Blazers	HAR	Not released							NR	NR	NR	NR	NR	NR	NR		
UAB Blazers	BCS	Not released															
UTSA Roadrunners	AP	NR	NR	NR	NR	NR	NR	NR	NR	NR	NR	NR	NR	NR	NR		
UTSA Roadrunners	C	NR	NR	NR	NR	NR	NR	NR	NR	NR	NR	NR	NR	NR	NR		
UTSA Roadrunners	HAR	Not released							NR	NR	NR	NR	NR	NR	NR		
UTSA Roadrunners	BCS	Not released															
UTEP Miners	AP	NR	NR	NR	NR	NR	NR	NR	NR	NR	NR	NR	NR	NR	NR		
UTEP Miners	C	NR	NR	NR	NR	NR	NR	NR	NR	NR	NR	NR	NR	NR	NR		
UTEP Miners	HAR	Not released							NR	NR	NR	NR	NR	NR	NR		
UTEP Miners	BCS	Not released															

== All-Conference players ==
Coaches All-Conference Selections

Position	Player	Class	Team
First Team Offense (Coaches)
QB	Shane Carden	JR	East Carolina
RB	Charles Ross	SR	Rice
RB	Trey Watts	SR	Tulsa
OL	Stetson Burnett	SR	Tulsa
OL	Chris Jasperse	JR	Marshall
OL	Cyril Lemon	JR	North Texas
OL	Nate Richards	SR	Rice
OL	Will Simmons	SR	East Carolina
TE	Gator Hoskins	SR	Marshall
WR	Justin Hardy	JR	East Carolina
WR	Ryan Grant	SR	Tulane
WR	Tommy Shuler	JR	Marshall
First Team Defense (Coaches)
DL	Christian Covington	SO	Rice
DL	Cory Henry	SR	Florida Atlantic
DL	IK Enemkpali	SR	Louisiana Tech
DL	James Rouse	SR	Marshall
LB	T. T. Barber	SO	Middle Tennessee
LB	Shawn Jackson	SR	Tulsa
LB	Zach Orr	SR	North Texas
DB	Lorenzo Doss	SO	Tulane
DB	Phillip Gaines	SR	Rice
DB	D'Joun Smith	JR	Florida Atlantic
DB	Marcus Trice	SR	North Texas
First Team Special Teams (Coaches)
K	Cairo Santos	SR	Tulane
P	Hunter Mullins	JR	UAB
KR	Brelan Chancellor	SR	North Texas
PR	Brelan Chancellor	SR	North Texas
LS	Trevor Gillette	SR	Rice

Position	Player	Class	Team
Second Team Offense (Coaches)
QB	Rakeem Cato	JR	Marshall
RB	Vintavious Cooper	JR	East Carolina
RB	Kenneth Dixon	SO	Louisiana Tech
OL	Jordan Davis	SR	East Carolina
OL	Garrett Scott	SR	Marshall
OL	Clint Van Horn	SO	Marshall
OL	Josh Walker	SR	Middle Tennessee
OL	Mason Y'Barbo	JR	North Texas
OL	Scott Inskeep	JR	UTSA
TE	Turner Peterson	SR	Rice
WR	Brelan Chancellor	SR	North Texas
WR	J. J. Nelson	JR	UAB
WR	Jordan Taylor	JR	Rice
Second Team Defense (Coaches)
DL	Aaron Bellazin	SR	North Texas
DL	Greg Hickman	SR	FIU
DL	Lee Pegues	SR	East Carolina
DL	Khyri Thornton	SR	Southern Miss
LB	Jermaine Holmes	JR	Marshall
LB	Derrell Johnson	SR	East Carolina
LB	Andrae Kirk	JR	Florida Atlantic
LB	Michael Kutzler	SR	Rice
DB	Bryce Callahan	JR	Rice
DB	Damon Magazu	SR	East Carolina
DB	Michal Mudoh	SO	Tulsa
DB	Triston Wade	JR	UTSA
Second Team Special Teams (Coaches)
K	Chris Boswell	SR	Rice
P	Sean Kelly	SO	Florida Atlantic
KR	Autrey Golden	SO	UTEP
PR	Devon Smith	SR	Marshall
LS	Josh Cuthbert	SR	Louisiana Tech
