= 2013 North Texas Mean Green football team =

American college football season

2013 North Texas Mean Green football
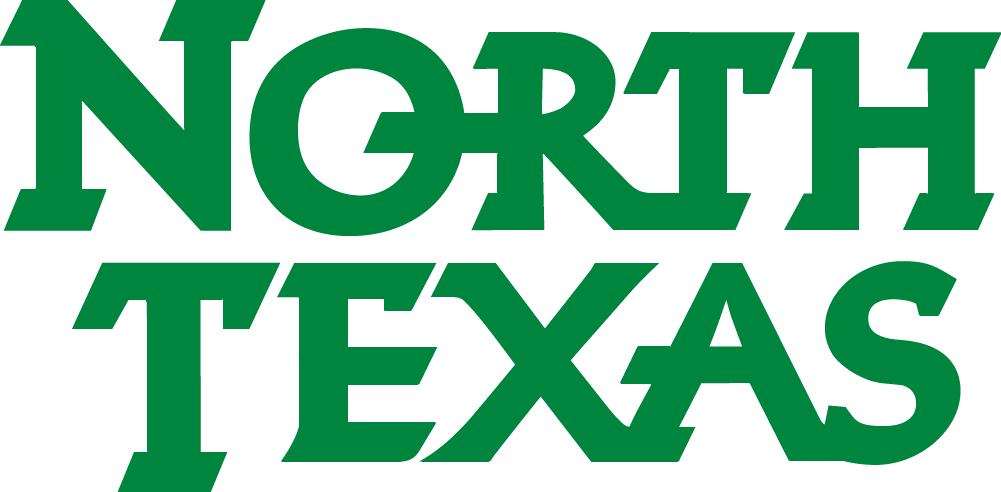

Heart of Dallas Bowl champion

Heart of Dallas Bowl, W 36–14 vs. UNLV
- Conference: Conference USA
- West Division
- Record: 9–4 (6–2 C-USA)
- Head coach: Dan McCarney (3rd season)
- Offensive coordinator: Mike Canales (4th season)
- Offensive scheme: Pro-style
- Defensive coordinator: John Skladany (2nd season)
- Base defense: 4–3
- Home stadium: Apogee Stadium

2013 Conference USA football standings
	Conf.			Overall
Team	W		L	W		L
East Division
Marshall x	7	–	1	10	–	4
East Carolina	6	–	2	10	–	3
Middle Tennessee	6	–	2	8	–	5
Florida Atlantic	4	–	4	6	–	6
UAB	1	–	7	2	–	10
Southern Miss	1	–	7	1	–	11
FIU	1	–	7	1	–	11
West Division
Rice x$	7	–	1	10	–	4
UTSA	6	–	2	7	–	5
North Texas	6	–	2	9	–	4
Tulane	5	–	3	7	–	6
Louisiana Tech	3	–	5	4	–	8
Tulsa	2	–	6	3	–	9
UTEP	1	–	7	2	–	10
Championship: Rice 41, Marshall 24
$ – Conference champion; x – Division champion/co-champions; Rankings from AP Poll

The 2013 North Texas Mean Green football team represented the University of North Texas as a member of Conference USA (C-USA) during the 2013 NCAA Division I FBS football season. Led by third-year head coach Dan McCarney, the Mean Green compiled an overall record of 9–4 with a mark 6–2 in conference play, tying for second place in C-USA's West Division. North Texas was invited to the Heart of Dallas Bowl, where the Mean Green defeated UNLV. The team played home games at Apogee Stadium in Denton, Texas.

This was the North Texas's first season competing in C-USA after 12 season a member of the Sun Belt Conference. The Mean Green began the season with a 2–3 record before going on a five-game winning streak, culminating in a win against the Rice Owls. A lost to UTSA Roadrunners on November 23, eliminated North Texas from conference championship contention. The Mean Green finished with a winning record for the first time since 2004 season.

== Schedule ==
Date	Time	Opponent	Site	TV	Result	Attendance
August 31	6:00 pm	Idaho*	Apogee Stadium; Denton, TX	NTTV	W 40–6	21,975
September 7	6:00 pm	at Ohio*	Peden Stadium; Athens, OH	ESPN3	L 21–27	24,511
September 14	3:00 pm	Ball State*	Apogee Stadium; Denton, TX	FSN	W 34–27	14,747
September 21	11:21 am	at No. 9 Georgia*	Sanford Stadium; Athens, GA	SECTV	L 21–45	92,746
October 5	2:30 pm	at Tulane	Mercedes–Benz Superdome; New Orleans, LA	FCS	L 21–24	20,734
October 12	6:00 pm	Middle Tennessee	Apogee Stadium; Denton, TX	NTTV	W 34–7	21,171
October 19	2:30 pm	at Louisiana Tech	Joe Aillet Stadium; Ruston, LA	CBSSN	W 28–13	20,317
October 26	6:00 pm	at Southern Miss	M. M. Roberts Stadium; Hattiesburg, MS	FCS	W 55–14	23,203
October 31	6:30 pm	Rice	Apogee Stadium; Denton, TX	FS1	W 28–16	22,835
November 9	2:30 pm	UTEP^{†}	Apogee Stadium; Denton, TX	CSS, TWCSC	W 41–7	26,119
November 23	2:30 pm	UTSA	Apogee Stadium; Denton, TX	TWCSC	L 13–21	19,335
November 30	1:30 pm	at Tulsa	Skelly Field at H. A. Chapman Stadium; Tulsa, OK	FSN	W 42–10	17,792
January 1, 2014	11:00 am	vs. UNLV*	Cotton Bowl; Dallas, TX (Heart of Dallas Bowl)	ESPNU	W 36–14	38,380
*Non-conference game; ^{†}Homecoming; Rankings from AP Poll released prior to the game; All times are in Central time

== Game summaries ==
=== Idaho ===
Idaho Vandals at North Texas Mean Green – Game summary

Quarter	1	2	3	4	Total
Vandals	6	0	0	0	6
Mean Green	14	12	7	7	40

at Apogee Stadium, Denton, Texas

- Date: August 31
- Game time: 6:00 p.m. CDT
- Game weather: Clear, 103 °F (39 °C)
- Game attendance: 21,975
- Referee: Jerry Banks
- TV: NTTV
- Box score, Recap

Game information
First quarter
- IDHO – Jake Manley 6-yard pass from Chad Chalich (kick blocked), 13:00. Vandals 6–0. Drive: 3 plays, 5 yards, 0:40.
- UNT – Brandin Byrd 1-yard run (Zach Olen kick), 8:05. Mean Green 7–6. Drive: 9 plays, 75 yards, 2:54.
- UNT – Brelan Chancellor 85-yard pass from Derek Thompson (Zach Olen kick), 5:17. Mean Green 14–6. Drive: 3 plays, 81 yards, 1:21.

Second quarter

- UNT – Mark Lewis 1-yard run (kick failed), 6:34. Mean Green 20–6. Drive: 15 plays, 49 yards, 6:13.
- UNT – Brandin Byrd 27-yard run (kick blocked), 2:46. Mean Green 26–6. Drive: 2 plays, 38 yards, 0:27.

Third quarter

- UNT – Reggie Pegram 2-yard run (Zach Paul kick), 3:28. Mean Green 33–6. Drive: 9 plays, 89 yards, 3:16.

Fourth quarter

- UNT – Darius Terrell 30-yard pass from Derek Thompson (Zach Paul kick), 11:17. Mean Green 40–6. Drive: 10 plays, 90 yards, 3:34.

Statistics	IDHO	UNT
First downs	14	27
Total yards	369	591
Rushing yards	139	187
Passing yards	230	404
Turnovers	3	2
Time of possession	28:41	31:19

Team	Category	Player	Statistics
Idaho	Passing	Chad Chalich	19/27, 230 yards, TD
Idaho	Rushing	Jerrel Brown	6 rushes, 70 yards
Idaho	Receiving	Dezmon Epps	8 receptions, 94 yards
North Texas	Passing	Derek Thompson	23/27, 349 yards, 2 TD
North Texas	Rushing	Brandin Byrd	7 rushes, 57 yards, 2 TD
North Texas	Receiving	Brelan Chancellor	6 receptions, 135 yards, TD

=== At Ohio ===
North Texas Mean Green at Ohio Bobcats – Game summary

Quarter	1	2	3	4	Total
Mean Green	7	0	7	7	21
Bobcats	7	14	0	6	27

at Peden Stadium, Athens, Ohio

- Date: September 7
- Game time: 6:00 p.m. CDT/7:00 p.m. EDT
- Game weather: Clear, 77 °F (25 °C)
- Game attendance: 24,511
- Referee: Steve Barth
- TV: ESPN3
- Box score, Recap

Game information
First quarter
- OHIO – Chase Cochran 75-yard pass from Tyler Tettleton (Matt Greem kick), 14:50. Bobcats 7–0. Drive: 1 play, 80 yards, 0:10.
- UNT – Antoinne Jimmerson 3-yard run (Zach Paul kick), 2:04. Tied 7–7. Drive: 10 plays, 46 yards, 4:58.

Second quarter

- OHIO – Ryan Boykin 10-yard pass from Tyler Tettleton (Matt Greem kick), 13:12. Bobcats 14–7. Drive: 10 plays, 72 yards, 3:47.
- OHIO – Jovon Johnson 42-yard interception return (Matt Greem kick), 12:34. Bobcats 21–7.

Third quarter

- UNT – Carlos Harris 31-yard pass from Derek Thompson (Zach Paul kick), 4:25. Bobcats 21–14. Drive: 5 plays, 53 yards, 2:08.

Fourth quarter

- UNT – Darnell Smith 6-yard pass from Derek Thompson (Zach Paul kick), 12:51. Tied 21–21. Drive: 8 plays, 56 yards, 2:53.
- OHIO – Matt Greem 38-yard field goal, 8:08. Bobcats 24–21. Drive: 10 plays, 55 yards, 4:36.
- OHIO – Matt Greem 22-yard field goal, 1:23. Bobcats 27–21. Drive: 11 plays, 62 yards, 5:44.

Statistics	UNT	OHIO
First downs	14	20
Total yards	299	442
Rushing yards	104	203
Passing yards	195	239
Turnovers	4	3
Time of possession	40:26	32:03

Team	Category	Player	Statistics
North Texas	Passing	Derek Thompson	19/29, 195 yards, 2 TD, 2 INT
North Texas	Rushing	Antoinne Jimmerson	12 rushes, 35 yards, TD
North Texas	Receiving	Darnell Smith	9 receptions, 89 yards, TD
Ohio	Passing	Tyler Tettleton	19/30, 239 yards, 2 TD, 2 INT
Ohio	Rushing	Ryan Boykin	19 rushes, 93 yards
Ohio	Receiving	Chase Cochran	6 receptions, 103 yards, TD

=== Ball State ===
Ball State Cardinals at North Texas Mean Green – Game summary

Quarter	1	2	3	4	Total
Cardinals	20	7	0	0	27
Mean Green	3	13	8	10	34

at Apogee Stadium, Denton, Texas

- Date: September 14
- Game time: 3:00 p.m. CDT
- Game weather: Clear, 90 °F (32 °C)
- Game attendance: 14,747
- Referee: Mark Klucznski
- TV: FSN
- Box score, Recap

Game information
First quarter
- BALL – Willie Snead 2-yard pass from Keith Wenning (pass failed), 11:48. Cardinals 6–0. Drive: 9 plays, 75 yards, 3:12.
- UNT – Zach Paul 48-yard field goal, 8:12. Cardinals 6–3. Drive: 9 plays, 34 yards, 3:36.
- BALL – Horactio Banks 77-yard run (Scott Secor kick), 5:28. Cardinals 13–3. Drive: 4 plays, 91 yards, 0:52.
- BALL – Brian Jones 3-yard fumble return (Scott Secor kick), 0:20. Cardinals 20–3.

Second quarter

- UNT – Zach Paul 22-yard field goal, 11:04. Cardinals 20–6. Drive: 11 plays, 70 yards, 4:16.
- UNT – Zach Paul 47-yard field goal, 6:23. Cardinals 20–9. Drive: 7 plays, 27 yards, 3:13.
- BALL – Willie Snead 27-yard pass from Keith Wenning (Scott Secor kick), 3:26. Cardinals 27–9. Drive: 10 plays, 75 yards, 2:57.
- UNT – Brelan Chancellor 25-yard pass from Derek Thompson (Zach Paul kick), 1:50. Cardinals 27–16. Drive: 4 plays, 71 yards, 1:36.

Third quarter

- UNT – Reggie Pegram 32-yard run (Derek Thompson pass to Drew Miller), 12:37. Cardinals 27–24. Drive: 7 plays, 74 yards, 2:23.

Fourth quarter

- UNT – Zach Paul 19-yard field goal, 14:51. Tied 27–27. Drive: 15 plays, 66 yards, 5:32.
- UNT – Derek Thompson 26-yard run (Zach Paul kick), 9:47. Mean Green 34–27. Drive: 9 plays, 56 yards, 3:58.

Statistics	BALL	UNT
First downs	19	31
Total yards	496	505
Rushing yards	163	231
Passing yards	333	274
Turnovers	5	1
Time of possession	22:24	37:36

Team	Category	Player	Statistics
Ball State	Passing	Keith Wenning	27/46, 333 yards, 2 TD, 2 INT
Ball State	Rushing	Horactio Banks	11 rushes, 141 yards, TD
Ball State	Receiving	Jamill Smith	4 receptions, 115 yards
North Texas	Passing	Derek Thompson	31/47, 274 yards, TD
North Texas	Rushing	Brandin Byrd	18 rushes, 79 yards
North Texas	Receiving	Brelan Chancellor	9 receptions, 88 yards, TD

=== At No. 9 Georgia ===
North Texas Mean Green at No. 9 Georgia Bulldogs – Game summary

Quarter	1	2	3	4	Total
Mean Green	0	14	7	0	21
No. 9 Bulldogs	7	14	14	10	45

at Sanford Stadium, Athens, Georgia

- Date: September 21
- Game time: 11:21 a.m. CDT/12:21 p.m. EDT
- Game attendance: 92,746
- TV: SECTV
- Box score, Recap

Game information
First quarter
- UGA – Todd Gurley 12-yard run (Marshall Morgan kick), 3:41. Bulldogs 7–0. Drive: 6 plays, 69 yards, 2:01.

Second quarter

- UGA – Reggie Davis 98-yard pass from Aaron Murray (Marshall Morgan kick), 14:46. Bulldogs 14–0. Drive: 1 play, 98 yards, 0:14.
- UNT – Darnell Smith 20-yard pass from Derek Thompson (Zach Paul kick), 9:53. Bulldogs 14–7. Drive: 10 plays, 86 yards, 4:53.
- UGA – Arthur Lynch 16-yard pass from Aaron Murray (Marshall Morgan kick), 7:27. Bulldogs 21–7. Drive: 6 plays, 75 yards, 2:26.
- UNT – Brelan Chancellor 99-yard kickoff return (Zach Paul kick), 7:12. Bulldogs 21–14.

Third quarter

- UNT – Marcus Trice 0-yard blocked punt return (Zach Paul kick), 14:17. Tied 21–21.
- UGA – Aaron Murray 1-yard run (Marshall Morgan kick), 7:11. Bulldogs 28–21. Drive: 8 plays, 53 yards, 2:42.
- UGA – Chris Conley 4-yard pass from Aaron Murray (Marshall Morgan kick), 0:43. Bulldogs 35–21. Drive: 12 plays, 95 yards, 4:41.

Fourth quarter

- UGA – Marshall Morgan 27-yard field goal, 3:45. Bulldogs 38–21. Drive: 11 plays, 78 yards, 6:07.
- UGA – J. J. Green 1-yard run (Marshall Morgan kick), 1:46. Bulldogs 45–21. Drive: 2 plays, 41 yards, 0:14.

Statistics	UNT	UGA
First downs	13	26
Total yards	245	641
Rushing yards	7	191
Passing yards	238	450
Turnovers	1	2
Time of possession	27:28	31:57

Team	Category	Player	Statistics
North Texas	Passing	Derek Thompson	21/36, 202 yards, TD, INT
North Texas	Rushing	Brandin Byrd	11 rushes, 23 yards
North Texas	Receiving	Reggie Pegram	4 receptions, 53 yards
Georgia	Passing	Aaron Murray	22/30, 408 yards, 3 TD, INT
Georgia	Rushing	Todd Gurley	21 rushes, 91 yards, TD
Georgia	Receiving	Reggie Davis	2 receptions, 134 yards, TD

=== At Tulane ===
North Texas Mean Green at Tulane Green Wave – Game summary

Quarter	1	2	3	4	Total
Mean Green	0	0	7	14	21
Green Wave	0	7	14	3	24

at Mercedes–Benz Superdome, New Orleans, Louisiana

- Date: October 5
- Game time: 2:30 p.m. CDT
- Game weather: None (played indoors)
- Game attendance: 20,734
- Referee: Brad Rogers
- TV: FCS
- Box score, Recap

Game information
First quarter
- No scoring plays

Second quarter

- TULN – Justyn Shackleford 6-yard pass from Nick Montana (Cairo Santos kick), 8:06. Green Wave 7–0. Drive: 12 plays, 80 yards, 6:45.

Third quarter

- UNT – Mason Y'Barbo 0-yard fumble return (Zach Paul kick), 8:27. Tied 7–7.
- TULN – Derrick Strozier 62-yard blocked field goal return (Cairo Santos kick), 4:34. Green Wave 14–7.
- TULN – Lorenzo Doss 59-yard interception return (Cairo Santos kick), 2:50. Green Wave 21–7.

Fourth quarter

- UNT – Brandin Byrd 1-yard pass from Derek Thompson (Zach Paul kick), 14:16. Green Wave 21–14. Drive: 9 plays, 47 yards, 3:24.
- UNT – Darnell Smith 62-yard pass from Derek Thompson (Zach Paul kick), 3:45. Tied 21–21. Drive: 4 plays, 74 yards, 1:03.
- TULN – Cairo Santos 27-yard field goal, 0:00. Green Wave 24–21. Drive: 11 plays, 66 yards, 3:45.

Statistics	UNT	TULN
First downs	18	17
Total yards	360	227
Rushing yards	34	95
Passing yards	326	132
Turnovers	2	1
Time of possession	27:44	32:16

Team	Category	Player	Statistics
North Texas	Passing	Derek Thompson	29/42, 326 yards, 2 TD, 2 INT
North Texas	Rushing	Derek Thompson	6 rushes, 19 yards
North Texas	Receiving	Darnell Smith	8 receptions, 130 yards, TD
Tulane	Passing	Nick Montana	18/28, 132 yards, TD
Tulane	Rushing	Orleans Darkwa	16 rushes, 44 yards
Tulane	Receiving	Ryan Grant	7 receptions, 60 yards

=== Middle Tennessee ===
Middle Tennessee Blue Raiders at North Texas Mean Green – Game summary

Quarter	1	2	3	4	Total
Blue Raiders	0	7	0	0	7
Mean Green	7	17	0	10	34

at Apogee Stadium, Denton, Texas

- Date: October 12
- Game time: 6:00 p.m. CDT
- Game weather: Overcast, 73 °F (23 °C)
- Game attendance: 21,171
- Referee: Wayne Winkler
- TV: NTTV
- Box score, Recap

Game information
First quarter
- UNT – Reggie Pegram 5-yard run (Zach Paul kick), 3:38. Mean Green 7–0. Drive: 11 plays, 71 yards, 4:18.

Second quarter

- MTSU – Austin Grammer 5-yard run (Cody Clark kick), 11:48. Tied 7–7. Drive: 7 plays, 57 yards, 2:30.
- UNT – Brandin Byrd 1-yard run (Zach Paul kick), 6:57. Mean Green 14–7. Drive: 12 plays, 75 yards, 4:51.
- UNT – Lairamie Lee 20-yard interception return (Zach Paul kick), 6:42. Mean Green 21–7.
- UNT – Zach Paul 21-yard field goal, 0:30. Mean Green 24–7. Drive: 4 plays, 9 yards, 1:26.

Third quarter

- No scoring plays

Fourth quarter

- UNT – Zach Paul 22-yard field goal, 11:27. Mean Green 27–7. Drive: 7 plays, 20 yards, 3:14.
- UNT – Reggie Pegram 4-yard run (Zach Paul kick), 2:56. Mean Green 34–7. Drive: 7 plays, 47 yards, 3:42.

Statistics	MT	UNT
First downs	13	25
Total yards	205	416
Rushing yards	139	303
Passing yards	66	113
Turnovers	3	3
Time of possession	22:11	37:49

Team	Category	Player	Statistics
Middle Tennessee	Passing	Austin Grammer	6/22, 36 yards, INT
Middle Tennessee	Rushing	Austin Grammer	15 rushes, 106 yards, TD
Middle Tennessee	Receiving	Chris Perkins	5 receptions, 33 yards
North Texas	Passing	Derek Thompson	13/19, 113 yards, 2 INT
North Texas	Rushing	Brandin Byrd	20 rushes, 139 yards, TD
North Texas	Receiving	Darnell Smith	5 receptions, 44 yards

=== At Louisiana Tech ===
North Texas Mean Green at Louisiana Tech Bulldogs – Game summary

Quarter	1	2	3	4	Total
Mean Green	0	14	14	0	28
Bulldogs	7	3	0	3	13

at Joe Aillet Stadium, Ruston, Louisiana

- Date: October 19
- Game time: 2:30 p.m. CDT
- Game weather: Overcast, 64 °F (18 °C), NNW 11 miles per hour (18 km/h)
- Game attendance: 20,317
- Referee: Brad Rogers
- TV announcers (CBSSN): Brad Johansen (play-by-play), Randy Cross (analyst), Rashan Ali (sideline)
- Box score, Recap

Game information
First quarter
- LT – Ryan Higgins 2-yard run (Kyle Fischer kick), 7:50. Bulldogs 7–0. Drive: 5 plays, 25 yards, 2:19.

Second quarter

- LT – Kyle Fischer 40-yard field goal, 6:13. Bulldogs 10–0. Drive: 9 plays, 47 yards, 2:22.
- UNT – Brelan Chancellor 61-yard pass from Derek Thompson (Zach Paul kick), 3:53. Bulldogs 10–7. Drive: 5 plays, 86 yards, 2:20.
- UNT – Zac Whitfield 56-yard interception return (Zach Paul kick), 2:05. Mean Green 14–10.

Third quarter

- UNT – Derek Thompson 3-yard run (Zach Paul kick), 7:05. Mean Green 21–10. Drive: 4 plays, 43 yards, 1:58.
- UNT – Brandin Byrd 1-yard run (Zach Paul kick), 0:40. Mean Green 28–10. Drive: 11 plays, 66 yards, 4:16.

Fourth quarter

- LT – Kyle Fischer 35-yard field goal, 12:27. Mean Green 28–13. Drive: 10 plays, 57 yards, 3:13.

Statistics	UNT	LT
First downs	20	20
Total yards	386	404
Rushing yards	165	37
Passing yards	221	367
Turnovers	1	3
Time of possession	32:51	27:09

Team	Category	Player	Statistics
North Texas	Passing	Derek Thompson	16/24, 221 yards, TD, INT
North Texas	Rushing	Brandin Byrd	14 carries, 71 yards, TD
North Texas	Receiving	Brelan Chancellor	5 receptions, 95 yards, TD
Louisiana Tech	Passing	Ryan Higgins	36/54, 343 yards, 2 INT
Louisiana Tech	Rushing	Kenneth Dixon	12 carries, 25 yards
Louisiana Tech	Receiving	Andrew Guillot	10 receptions, 99 yards

=== At Southern Miss ===
North Texas Mean Green at Southern Miss Golden Eagles – Game summary

Quarter	1	2	3	4	Total
Mean Green	13	28	7	7	55
Golden Eagles	0	7	7	0	14

at M. M. Roberts Stadium, Hattiesburg, Mississippi

- Date: October 26
- Game time: 6:00 p.m. CDT
- Game attendance: 23,203
- Referee: Clay Martin
- TV: FCS
- Box score, Recap

Game information
First quarter
- UNT – Brelan Chancellor 46-yard pass from Derek Thompson (Zach Paul kick), 8:15. Mean Green 7–0. Drive: 6 plays, 80 yards, 1:53.
- UNT – Reggie Pegram 2-yard run (kick failed), 0:19. Mean Green 13–0. Drive: 13 plays, 78 yards, 6:37.

Second quarter

- USM – Dominique Sullivan 59-yard pass from Nick Mullens (Cory Acosta kick), 10:57. Mean Green 13–7. Drive: 3 plays, 84 yards, 1:13.
- UNT – Brandin Byrd 1-yard run (Zach Paul kick), 9:13. Mean Green 20–7. Drive: 5 plays, 61 yards, 1:44.
- UNT – Antoinne Jimmerson 15-yard pass from Derek Thompson (Zach Paul kick), 4:23. Mean Green 27–7. Drive: 9 plays, 52 yards, 4:00.
- UNT – Derek Thompson 3-yard run (Zach Paul kick), 1:38. Mean Green 34–7. Drive: 5 plays, 67 yards, 1:42.
- UNT – Antoinne Jimmerson 6-yard run (Zach Paul kick), 0:37. Mean Green 41–7. Drive: 3 plays, 13 plays, 0:39.

Third quarter

- USM – George Payne 2-yard run (Corey Acosta kick), 13:55. Mean Green 41–14. Drive: 1 play, 2 yards, 0:05.
- UNT – Reggie Pegram 1-yard run (Zach Paul kick), 3:36. Mean Green 48–14. Drive: 8 plays, 40 yards, 4:21.

Fourth quarter

- UNT – Brandin Byrd 8-yard run (Zach Paul kick), 14:14. Mean Green 55–14. Drive: 8 plays, 39 yards, 4:04.

Statistics	UNT	USM
First downs	30	10
Total yards	529	249
Rushing yards	229	39
Passing yards	300	210
Turnovers	4	5
Time of possession	41:51	18:09

Team	Category	Player	Statistics
North Texas	Passing	Derek Thompson	18/27, 300 yards, 2 TD, 2 INT
North Texas	Rushing	Reggie Pegram	19 rushes, 74 yards, 2 TD
North Texas	Receiving	Brelan Chancellor	4 receptions, 127 yards, TD
Southern Miss	Passing	Nick Mullins	12/31, 210 yards, TD, 3 INT
Southern Miss	Rushing	George Payne	9 rushes, 44 yards, TD
Southern Miss	Receiving	Dominique Sullivan	2 receptions, 97 yards, TD

=== Rice ===
Rice Owls at North Texas Mean Green – Game summary

Quarter	1	2	3	4	Total
Owls	2	14	0	0	16
Mean Green	7	14	7	0	28

at Apogee Stadium, Denton, Texas

- Date: October 31
- Game time: 6:30 p.m. CDT
- Game weather: Clear, 69 °F (21 °C)
- Game attendance: 22,835
- Referee: Chris Snead
- TV: FS1
- Box score, Recap

Statistics	RICE	UNT
First downs		
Total yards		
Rushing yards		
Passing yards		
Turnovers		
Time of possession		

Team	Category	Player	Statistics
Rice	Passing		
Rice	Rushing		
Rice	Receiving		
North Texas	Passing		
North Texas	Rushing		
North Texas	Receiving		

With the win, the Mean Green became bowl eligible for the first time since the 2004 season.

=== UTEP ===
UTEP Miners at North Texas Mean Green – Game summary

Quarter	1	2	3	4	Total
Miners	0	0	7	0	7
Mean Green	14	7	7	13	41

at Apogee Stadium, Denton, Texas

- Date: November 9
- Game time: 2:30 p.m. CST
- Game attendance: 26,119
- TV: CSS/TWCSC
- Box score, Recap

Statistics	UTEP	UNT
First downs		
Total yards		
Rushing yards		
Passing yards		
Turnovers		
Time of possession		

Team	Category	Player	Statistics
UTEP	Passing		
UTEP	Rushing		
UTEP	Receiving		
North Texas	Passing		
North Texas	Rushing		
North Texas	Receiving		

=== UTSA ===
UTSA Roadrunners at North Texas Mean Green – Game summary

Quarter	1	2	3	4	Total
Roadrunners	7	0	7	7	21
Mean Green	0	3	0	10	13

at Apogee Stadium, Denton, Texas

- Date: November 23
- Game time: 2:30 p.m. CST
- Game attendance: 19,335
- TV: TWCS
- Box score, Recap

Statistics	UTSA	UNT
First downs		
Total yards		
Rushing yards		
Passing yards		
Turnovers		
Time of possession		

Team	Category	Player	Statistics
UTSA	Passing		
UTSA	Rushing		
UTSA	Receiving		
North Texas	Passing		
North Texas	Rushing		
North Texas	Receiving		

=== At Tulsa ===
North Texas Mean Green at Tulsa Golden Hurricane – Game summary

Quarter	1	2	3	4	Total
Mean Green	7	14	14	7	42
Golden Hurricane	10	0	0	0	10

at Chapman Stadium

- Date: November 30
- Game time: 1:30 p.m. CDT
- Game attendance: 17,792
- TV: FSN
- Box score, Recap

Statistics	UNT	TLSA
First downs		
Total yards		
Rushing yards		
Passing yards		
Turnovers		
Time of possession		

Team	Category	Player	Statistics
North Texas	Passing		
North Texas	Rushing		
North Texas	Receiving		
Tulsa	Passing		
Tulsa	Rushing		
Tulsa	Receiving		

=== Vs. UNLV (Heart of Dallas Bowl) ===
UNLV Rebels vs. North Texas Mean Green (Heart of Dallas Bowl) – Game summary

Quarter	1	2	3	4	Total
Rebels	7	0	0	7	14
Mean Green	7	0	7	22	36

at Cotton Bowl, Dallas, Texas

- Date: January 1, 2014
- Game time: 11:00 a.m. CST
- Game attendance: 38,380
- Referee: Ron Snodgrass
- TV announcers (ESPNU): Clay Matvick, Matt Stinchcomb, and Dawn Davenport
- Box score, Recap

Game information
First quarter
- UNLV – Marcus Sullivan 9-yard pass from Caleb Herring (Nolan Kohorst kick), 7:31. Rebels 7–0. Drive: 8 plays, 95 yards, 3:00.
- UNT – Antoinne Jimmerson 1-yard run (Zach Paul kick), 1:47. Tied 7–7. Drive: 8 plays, 43 yards, 3:55.

Second quarter

- No scoring plays

Third quarter

- UNT – Drew Miller 7-yard pass from Derek Thompson (Zach Paul kick), 6:07. Mean Green 14–7. Drive: 12 plays, 60 yards, 5:11.

Fourth quarter

- UNT – Brelan Chancellor 3-yard run (Zach Paul kick), 14:56. Mean Green 21–7. Drive: 12 plays, 74 yards, 4:44.
- UNT – Darnell Smith 34-yard pass from Derek Thompson (Zach Paul kick), 6:59. Mean Green 28–7. Drive: 10 plays, 75 yards, 5:31.
- UNLV – Jerry Rice Jr. 13-yard pass from Caleb Herring (Nolan Kohorst kick), 4:56. Mean Green 28–14. Drive: 7 plays, 50 yards, 2:03.
- UNT – Brelan Chancellor 15-yard run (Drew Miller run), 2:24. Mean Green 36–14. Drive: 3 plays, 16 yards, 1:39.

Statistics	UNLV	UNT
First downs	19	21
Total yards	262	397
Rushing yards	66	141
Passing yards	196	256
Turnovers	2	1
Time of possession	24:44	35:16

Team	Category	Player	Statistics
UNLV	Passing	Caleb Herring	22/41, 196 yards, 2 TD, 2 INT
UNLV	Rushing	Caleb Herring	15 rushes, 33 yards
UNLV	Receiving	Devante Davis	10 receptions, 96 yards
North Texas	Passing	Derek Thompson	21/30, 256 yards, 2 TD
North Texas	Rushing	Brandin Byrd	20 rushes, 52 yards
North Texas	Receiving	Darnell Smith	5 receptions, 75 yards, TD
