= 2014 Heart of Dallas Bowl =

2014 Heart of Dallas Bowl can refer to:

- 2014 Heart of Dallas Bowl (January), played as part of the 2013–14 college football bowl season between the North Texas Mean Green and the UNLV Rebels
- 2014 Heart of Dallas Bowl (December), played as part of the 2014–15 college football bowl season between the Louisiana Tech Bulldogs and the Illinois Fighting Illini
