= 2013 Tulane Green Wave football team =

American college football season

2013 Tulane Green Wave football
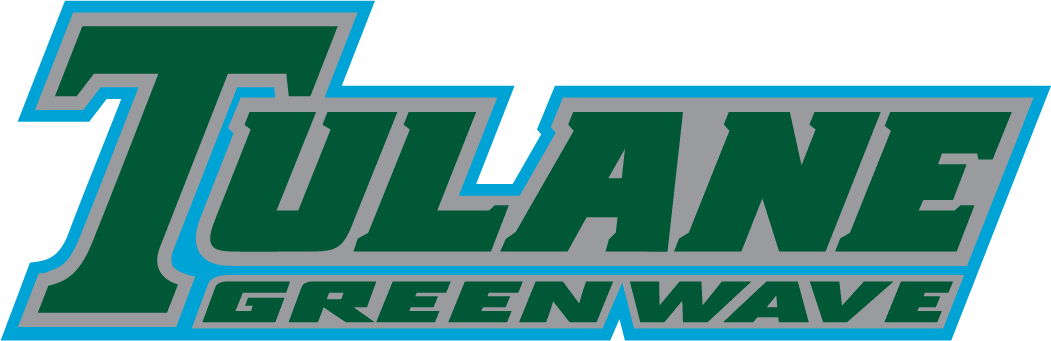

New Orleans Bowl vs Louisiana–Lafayette, L 21–24
- Conference: Conference USA
- West Division
- Record: 7–6 (5–3 C-USA)
- Head coach: Curtis Johnson (2nd season)
- Offensive coordinator: Eric Price (2nd season)
- Offensive scheme: Pro-style
- Co-defensive coordinators: Jon Sumrall (2nd season); Lionel Washington (2nd season)
- Base defense: 3–4 or 4–3
- Home stadium: Mercedes-Benz Superdome

2013 Conference USA football standings
	Conf.			Overall
Team	W		L	W		L
East Division
Marshall x	7	–	1	10	–	4
East Carolina	6	–	2	10	–	3
Middle Tennessee	6	–	2	8	–	5
Florida Atlantic	4	–	4	6	–	6
UAB	1	–	7	2	–	10
Southern Miss	1	–	7	1	–	11
FIU	1	–	7	1	–	11
West Division
Rice x$	7	–	1	10	–	4
UTSA	6	–	2	7	–	5
North Texas	6	–	2	9	–	4
Tulane	5	–	3	7	–	6
Louisiana Tech	3	–	5	4	–	8
Tulsa	2	–	6	3	–	9
UTEP	1	–	7	2	–	10
Championship: Rice 41, Marshall 24
$ – Conference champion; x – Division champion/co-champions; Rankings from AP Poll

The 2013 Tulane Green Wave football team represented Tulane University in the 2013 NCAA Division I FBS football season. They were led by second year head coach Curtis Johnson and played home games at the Mercedes-Benz Superdome. They were a member of Conference USA in the West Division. This was the Green Wave's last season playing in the Superdome and Conference USA as they will open the new, on-campus Yulman Stadium in the fall of 2014, and move to the American Athletic Conference in July 2014. They finished the season 7–6, 5–3 in C-USA play to finish in fourth place in the West Division. They were invited to the New Orleans Bowl where they lost to Louisiana–Lafayette.

In the 2013 season, Tulane reached 500 program wins, had its first winning record since 2002, and went to its first bowl game since the 2002 Hawaiʻi Bowl.

== Pre-season ==
=== Recruits ===
College recruiting information (2013)
Name	Hometown	School	Height	Weight	40^{‡}	Commit date
Richard Allen; CB	River Ridge, LA	John Curtis Christian	5 ft 9 in (1.75 m)	175 lb (79 kg)	4.38	Jul 9, 2012
Richard Allen; CB	Recruit ratings: Scout: Rivals: ESPN: (68)					
Ade Aruna; DE	La Porte, IN	La Lumiere School	6 ft 6 in (1.98 m)	230 lb (100 kg)	4.6	Feb 6, 2013
Ade Aruna; DE	Recruit ratings: Scout: Rivals: (NR)					
Sherman Badie; RB	River Ridge, LA	John Curtis Christian	5 ft 11.5 in (1.82 m)	195 lb (88 kg)	4.3	Nov 5, 2012
Sherman Badie; RB	Recruit ratings: Scout: Rivals: ESPN: (71)					
Eric Bell; DE	Edgard, LA	West St. John	6 ft 3 in (1.91 m)	250 lb (110 kg)	N/A	Jun 22, 2012
Eric Bell; DE	Recruit ratings: Scout: Rivals: ESPN: (67)					
Quinlan Carroll; OLB	Belle Chasse, LA	Belle Chasse	6 ft 1 in (1.85 m)	215 lb (98 kg)	N/A	Jun 22, 2012
Quinlan Carroll; OLB	Recruit ratings: Scout: Rivals: ESPN: (68)					
Tristan Cooper; WR	Tampa, FL	Plant	6 ft 0 in (1.83 m)	180 lb (82 kg)	N/A	Feb 4, 2013
Tristan Cooper; WR	Recruit ratings: Scout: Rivals: (NR)					
Leonard Davis; S	Reserve, LA	East St. John	6 ft 1 in (1.85 m)	200 lb (91 kg)	4.55	May 30, 2012
Leonard Davis; S	Recruit ratings: Scout: Rivals: (NR)					
Jarrod Franklin; S	Baton Rouge, LA	LSU Laboratory	6 ft 0 in (1.83 m)	195 lb (88 kg)	4.4	Jan 4, 2013
Jarrod Franklin; S	Recruit ratings: Scout: (NR)					
Brandon Godfrey; C	River Ridge, LA	John Curtis Christian	6 ft 4 in (1.93 m)	280 lb (130 kg)	N/A	May 29, 2012
Brandon Godfrey; C	Recruit ratings: Scout: Rivals: (NR)					
Luke Jackson; OLB	LaPlace, LA	St. Charles Catholic	6 ft 3 in (1.91 m)	210 lb (95 kg)	4.55	Jun 14, 2012
Luke Jackson; OLB	Recruit ratings: Scout: Rivals: ESPN: (64)					
Tanner Lee; QB	New Orleans, LA	Jesuit	6 ft 4 in (1.93 m)	195 lb (88 kg)	N/A	May 25, 2012
Tanner Lee; QB	Recruit ratings: Scout: Rivals: ESPN: (69)					
Mike Lizanich; LS	Phoenix, AZ	Pinnacle	6 ft 1 in (1.85 m)	215 lb (98 kg)	N/A	Jun 18, 2012
Mike Lizanich; LS	Recruit ratings: Scout: Rivals: ESPN: (68)					
Nico Marley; S	Weston, FL	Cypress Bay	5 ft 7 in (1.70 m)	185 lb (84 kg)	N/A	Jun 24, 2012
Nico Marley; S	Recruit ratings: Scout: Rivals: ESPN: (61)					
Sergio Medina; S	Boutte, LA	Hahnville	6 ft 0 in (1.83 m)	200 lb (91 kg)	4.45	Jan 27, 2013
Sergio Medina; S	Recruit ratings: Scout: Rivals: (NR)					
Nick Montana; QB	Walnut, CA	Mt. San Antonio JC	6 ft 3 in (1.91 m)	215 lb (98 kg)	4.8	Dec 18, 2012
Nick Montana; QB	Recruit ratings: Scout: Rivals: ESPN: (76)					
Parry Nickerson; CB	Harvey, LA	West Jefferson	5 ft 11 in (1.80 m)	170 lb (77 kg)	N/A	Jun 28, 2012
Parry Nickerson; CB	Recruit ratings: Scout: Rivals: (NR)					
Kenneth Santa Marina; OG	New Orleans, LA	McDonough 35	6 ft 5.5 in (1.97 m)	320 lb (150 kg)	N/A	Jan 25, 2013
Kenneth Santa Marina; OG	Recruit ratings: Scout: Rivals: ESPN: (77)					
Tanzel Smart; DT	Baton Rouge, LA	Scotlandville Magnet	6 ft 2 in (1.88 m)	290 lb (130 kg)	N/A	Feb 6, 2013
Tanzel Smart; DT	Recruit ratings: Scout: Rivals: (NR)					
Jason Stewart; OG	New Orleans, LA	Warren Easton Charter	6 ft 6 in (1.98 m)	330 lb (150 kg)	Apr 30, 2012	
Jason Stewart; OG	Recruit ratings: Scout: Rivals: ESPN: (70)					
Anthony Taylor; OT	River Ridge, LA	John Curtis Christian	6 ft 6.5 in (1.99 m)	330 lb (150 kg)	N/A	Mar 29, 2013
Anthony Taylor; OT	Recruit ratings: Scout: (NR)					
Chris Taylor; OG	Zachary, LA	Zachary	6 ft 3 in (1.91 m)	307 lb (139 kg)	5.2	Jun 22, 2012
Chris Taylor; OG	Recruit ratings: Scout: Rivals: ESPN: (83)					
Eric Thomas; MLB	River Ridge, LA	John Curtis Christian	5 ft 10 in (1.78 m)	230 lb (100 kg)	4.55	Nov 1, 2012
Eric Thomas; MLB	Recruit ratings: Scout: Rivals: (NR)					
William Townsend; CB	Miami, FL	Miami Norland	5 ft 11 in (1.80 m)	195 lb (88 kg)	4.5	Nov 26, 2012
William Townsend; CB	Recruit ratings: Scout: Rivals: (NR)					
Eldrick Washington; DE	Harvey, LA	Helen Cox	6 ft 2 in (1.88 m)	250 lb (110 kg)	N/A	May 17, 2012
Eldrick Washington; DE	Recruit ratings: Scout: Rivals: ESPN: (67)					
Edward Williams; MLB	New Orleans, LA	Warren Easton Charter	6 ft 2 in (1.88 m)	220 lb (100 kg)	4.6	Mar 5, 2013
Edward Williams; MLB	Recruit ratings: Scout: Rivals: ESPN: (73)					
Overall recruit ranking: Scout: 93 Rivals: 77
‡ Refers to 40-yard dash; Note: In many cases, Scout, Rivals, 247Sports, On3, and ESPN may conflict in their listings of height, weight and 40 time.; In these cases, the average was taken. ESPN grades are on a 100-point scale.; Sources: "2013 Tulane Football Commitment List". Rivals.; "2013 Tulane Commits". Scout.; "Tulane Green Wave 2013". ESPN.; "Scout.com Team Recruiting Rankings". Scout.; "2013 Team Ranking". Rivals.com.

=== Award watch lists ===
- Orleans Darkwa – Doak Walker Award Candidate (3rd consecutive year)
- Ryan Grant – Fred Biletnikoff Award Watch List
- Cairo Santos – Lou Groza Award Watch List (2012 award winner)

=== C-USA All-Conference Preseason Awards ===
- Cairo Santos – Special Teams Player of the Year
- Ryan Grant – First Team, Offense
- Lorenzo Doss – First Team, Defense
- Cairo Santos – First Team, Special Teams

== Roster ==
2013 Tulane Green Wave football team roster
Players
Coaches
Offense

Pos.	#	Name	Class
QB	1	Devin Powell	Fr
WR	3	Ryan Grant	Sr
WR	8	Devon Breaux	Fr
WR	9	Kedrick Banks	Fr
QB	11	Nick Montana	Jr
QB	12	Tanner Lee	Fr
WR	15	Marc Edwards	So
QB	16	Jordy Joseph	Jr
RB	24	Danté Butler	Jr
RB	25	Josh Rounds	So
RB	26	Orleans Darkwa	Sr
RB	28	Rob Kelley	Sr
RB	29	Alex O'Neill	Fr
RB	32	Sherman Badie	Fr
RB	33	Lazedrick Thompson	Fr
WR	36	Devin Boutte	Jr
WR	42	Carlos Wilson	Sr
RB	43	Marshall Wadleigh	Fr
WR	44	Alec Macias	So
C	50	Brandon Godfrey	Fr
OL	60	Preston Paine	Jr
OT	61	Colton Hanson	Fr
C	64	Mike Henry	Sr
C	65	Zach Morgan	Sr
OT	66	Nathan Shienle	Fr
G	67	Bob Bradley	So
OL	68	Arturo Uzdavinis	So
OT	70	Sean Donnelly	Jr
G	71	Jason Stewart	Fr
G	72	Rio Mares	Sr
G	73	Alex Paul	So
G	74	Adam Skidmore	Jr
OT	75	Chris Taylor	Fr
OT	76	Nate Skold	So
OT	78	Todd Jacquet	So
OT	79	Kenneth Santa Marina	Fr
WR	80	Justyn Shackleford	Jr
TE	81	Sydie London	So
WR	82	Xavier Rush	Jr
WR	83	Fudge Van Hooser	Fr
WR	84	JoJo Dobbs	Sr
WR	85	Larry Dace	So
TE	88	Matt Marfisi	Jr
WR	89	Thomas Vaughan	So

Defense

Pos.	#	Name	Class
S	2	Darion Monroe	So
CB	4	Taurean Nixon	Jr
S	5	Brandon LeBeau	Jr
CB	6	Lorenzo Doss	So
S	7	Edward Williams	Fr
CB	10	Leonard Davis	Fr
CB	13	Derrick Strozier	Sr
CB	14	Jordan Batiste	So
LB	20	Nico Marley	Fr
S	21	Kyle Davis	Sr
S	22	Jordan Sullen	Sr
CB	23	Richard Allen	Fr
S	27	Richard Carthon	So
S	30	Tristan Cooper	Fr
LB	34	Jarrod Franklin	Fr
S	35	Sam Scofield	Jr
S	37	LJ Parker	Sr
S	38	Anthony Bronzo	Jr
WR	39	William Townsend	Fr
FB	40	Taylor Bullock	Jr
DE	41	Aaron Bryant	So
LB	43	Tyler Gilbert	Jr
CB	44	Luke Jackson	Fr
LB	45	Matthew Bailey	Jr
LB	46	Sergio Medina	Fr
LB	47	Cameron DeJean	Jr
LB	48	Royce LaFrance	So
DE	51	Max Herman	Fr
LB	52	Eric Thomas	Fr
LB	53	Andre Robinson	Jr
DT	54	Quinlan Carroll	Fr
DT	56	Dominique Robertson	Sr
LB	57	Zach Davis	Sr
LB	58	Brandon Schmidt	Jr
LB	59	David Laborde	So
DT	77	Tanzel Smart	Fr
DT	87	Ade Aruna	Fr
DE	90	Jeremy Peeples	Sr
DE	91	Eldrick Washington	Fr
DT	92	Julius Warmsley	Sr
DT	93	Kenny Welcome	Jr
DE	94	Chris Davenport	Sr
DT	96	Corey Redwine	So
DT	98	Eric Bell	Fr
DT	99	Calvin Thomas	So

Special teams

Pos.	#	Name	Class
K	19	Cairo Santos	Sr
P	31	Peter Picerelli	So
P, K	62	Steven Broccoli	So
K, P	63	Casey Spinelli	Fr
P	69	Jonathan Ginsburgh	Sr
P, K	95	Logan Hilton	So
DS	97	Michael Lizanich	Fr

Head coach

- Curtis Johnson (2nd season)

Coordinators/assistant coaches

- Eric Price – Offensive Coordinator
- Jon Sumrall – Co-Defensive Coordinator/Defensive Line
- Lionel Washington – Co-Defensive Coordinator/Secondary
- David Johnson – Tight Ends/Running Backs
- Barry Lamb – Linebackers/Special Teams
- John McDonell – Offensive Line
- Mike Neu – Quarterbacks
- Jason Rollins – Secondary
- Keith Williams – Wide Receivers
- Byron Ellis – Director of Football Operations
- Doug Lichtenberger – Assistant AD for Football Operations/Recruiting
- Kwahn Drake – Graduate Assistant Coach, Defense
- Chad Jenkins – Graduate Assistant Coach, Defense
- Mike McCarthy – Graduate Assistant Coach, Offense
- Casey Robottom – Graduate Assistant Coach, Offense

Legend

- (C) Team captain
- (S) Suspended
- (I) Ineligible
- Injured
- Redshirt

Roster
Last update: October 10, 2013

== Schedule ==
Date	Time	Opponent	Site	TV	Result	Attendance
August 29	7:00 pm	Jackson State*	Mercedes-Benz Superdome; New Orleans, LA		W 34–7	20,992
September 7	2:30 pm	South Alabama*	Mercedes-Benz Superdome; New Orleans, LA	CST	L 39–41	19,414
September 12	6:30 pm	at Louisiana Tech	Joe Aillet Stadium; Ruston, LA	FS1	W 24–15	22,035
September 21	11:30 am	at Syracuse*	Carrier Dome; Syracuse, NY	ACCN	L 17–52	36,128
September 28	6:00 pm	at Louisiana–Monroe*	Malone Stadium; Monroe, LA	ESPN3	W 31–14	20,476
October 5	2:30 pm	North Texas^{†}	Mercedes-Benz Superdome; New Orleans, LA	FCS	W 24–21	20,734
October 12	2:30 pm	East Carolina	Mercedes-Benz Superdome; New Orleans, LA	WHNO*	W 36–33 ^{3OT}	15,157
October 26	2:30 pm	Tulsa	Mercedes-Benz Superdome; New Orleans, LA	CST	W 14–7	22,414
November 2	4:00 pm	at Florida Atlantic	FAU Stadium; Boca Raton, FL		L 17–34	16,406
November 9	1:00 pm	at UTSA	Alamodome; San Antonio, TX	WHNO	L 7–10	24,606
November 23	2:30 pm	UTEP	Mercedes-Benz Superdome; New Orleans, LA	CST	W 45–3	19,771
November 30	2:00 pm	at Rice	Rice Stadium; Houston, TX	FCS	L 13–17	20,048
December 21	8:00 pm	Louisiana–Lafayette*	Mercedes-Benz Superdome; New Orleans, LA (New Orleans Bowl)	ESPN	L 21–24	54,728
*Non-conference game; ^{†}Homecoming; All times are in Central time

x- *(Tape Delayed broadcast ) Source

== Game summaries ==
=== Jackson State ===
Jackson State at Tulane

Team	1	2	3	4	Total
JSU	0	0	0	7	7
• Tulane	13	7	7	7	34

- Location: New Orleans, LA
- Game start: 7:00 p.m. CDT
- Game attendance: 20,992
- Game weather: Indoors

This was the first meeting in football between Tulane and Jackson State.

=== South Alabama ===
South Alabama at Tulane

Team	1	2	3	4	Total
• S. Alabama	21	10	7	3	41
Tulane	7	12	14	6	39

- Location: New Orleans, LA
- Game start: 2:30 p.m. CDT
- Game attendance: 19,414
- Television network: CST

This was the first meeting in football between Tulane and South Alabama.

=== Louisiana Tech ===
Tulane at Louisiana Tech

Team	1	2	3	4	Total
• Tulane	7	0	10	7	24
LA Tech	6	3	0	6	15

- Location: Ruston, LA
- Game start: 6:30 p.m. CDT
- Game attendance: 22,035
- Television network: FS1

Tulane last played Louisiana Tech during its undefeated 1998 season, winning 63–30 at home. Tulane has never lost to Louisiana Tech in football.

=== Syracuse ===
Tulane at Syracuse

Team	1	2	3	4	Total
Tulane	10	7	0	0	17
• Syracuse	21	21	7	3	52

- Location: Syracuse, NY
- Game start: 12:30 p.m. EDT
- Game attendance: 36,128
- Game weather: Indoors
- Television network: ACCN

=== Louisiana-Monroe ===
Tulane at Louisiana-Monroe

Team	1	2	3	4	Total
• Tulane	3	7	21	0	31
ULM	0	0	7	7	14

- Location: Monroe, LA
- Game start: 6:00 p.m. CDT
- Game attendance: 20,476
- Television network: ESPN3

Orleans Darkwa led the team with 118 rushing yards, and the defense held their opponent scoreless in the first half for the second time in the season. Tulane forced 5 turnovers in the game and outgained ULM in rushing yards by 253 to 26.

=== North Texas ===
North Texas at Tulane
(Homecoming Game)

Team	1	2	3	4	Total
UNT	0	0	7	14	21
• Tulane	0	7	14	3	24

- Location: New Orleans, LA
- Game start: 2:30 p.m. CDT
- Game attendance: 20,734
- Game weather: Indoors
- Referee: Brad Rogers
- Television network: FCS

This was the first meeting in football between Tulane and North Texas. Tulane won as time expired on the clock with a 27-yard field goal from Lou Groza Award-winner Cairo Santos. It was Tulane's first homecoming victory since the 2006 season and gave the Green Wave its best season start since 2003 and best conference start since 1998. The victory was also Tulane football's 500th win all-time. The defense held their opponent scoreless in the first half for the third time in the season and had two interceptions. Special teams blocked a punt and returned it for a touchdown for the first time in school history.

Statistics	UNT	TULN
First downs	18	17
Total yards	360	227
Rushing yards	34	95
Passing yards	326	132
Turnovers	2	1
Time of possession	27:44	32:16

Team	Category	Player	Statistics
North Texas	Passing	Derek Thompson	29/42, 326 yards, 2 TD, 2 INT
North Texas	Rushing	Derek Thompson	6 rushes, 19 yards
North Texas	Receiving	Darnell Smith	8 receptions, 130 yards, TD
Tulane	Passing	Nick Montana	18/28, 132 yards, TD
Tulane	Rushing	Orleans Darkwa	16 rushes, 44 yards
Tulane	Receiving	Ryan Grant	7 receptions, 60 yards

=== East Carolina ===
East Carolina at Tulane

Team	1	2	3	4	OT	2OT	3OT	Total
ECU	3	3	0	13	7	7	0	33
• Tulane	3	3	10	3	7	7	3	36

- Location: New Orleans, LA
- Game start: 2:30 p.m. CDT
- Game attendance: 15,157
- Game weather: Indoors
- Television network: WHNO

Devin Powell played quarterback for Tulane, as starting quarterback Nick Montana was out with a shoulder injury. Cairo Santos kicked 5 field goals, including a 42-yard kick to win the game in triple overtime. Derrick Strozier intercepted an East Carolina pass and returned it 99 yards for a touchdown, while wearing one shoe. The game was the longest in school history and Tulane's first win over East Carolina since 2003. Following the victory, Tulane players won all three Conference USA weekly awards: Offensive Player of the Week (Devin Powell), Defensive Player of the Week (Derrick Strozier), and Special Teams Player of the Week (Cairo Santos).

=== Tulsa ===
Tulsa at Tulane

Team	1	2	3	4	Total
Tulsa	0	7	0	0	7
• Tulane	0	7	7	0	14

- Location: New Orleans, LA
- Game start: 2:30 p.m. CDT
- Game attendance: 22,414
- Game weather: Indoors
- Television network: CST

Tulane came away with a 14–7 victory, beating Tulsa for the first time since their initial meeting in 1968, a 25–15 Green Wave victory in Tulane Stadium. In the two teams' last 8 meetings, the Green Wave lost by an average score of 43–12. Tulane forced 4 turnovers and 8 penalties from a Tulsa team that was the least penalized in college football coming into the game. The Golden Hurricane managed only 7 points in a game for the first time since their season opener against Bowling Green. Devin Powell played quarterback in place of Nick Montana, who was still on the bench with a separated shoulder. With the win, Tulane became bowl-eligible for the first time since 2002.

=== Florida Atlantic ===
Tulane at Florida Atlantic

Team	1	2	3	4	Total
Tulane	7	10	0	0	17
• FAU	7	0	10	17	34

- Location: Boca Raton, FL
- Game start: 5:00 p.m. EDT
- Game attendance: 16,406

This was the first meeting in football between Tulane and Florida Atlantic.

=== UTSA ===
Tulane at UTSA

Team	1	2	3	4	Total
Tulane	0	7	0	0	7
• UTSA	0	0	7	3	10

- Location: San Antonio, TX
- Game start: 1:00 p.m. CST
- Game attendance: 24,606
- Game weather: Indoors
- Television network: WHNO

This was the first meeting in football between Tulane and UTSA. While the Green Wave compiled more yards and first downs than the Roadrunners, while holding the ball for 15 minutes more, the team committed 14 penalties for 105 yards. UTSA kicked a field goal with 14 seconds remaining on the clock to break the 7–7 tie and win the game. With the loss, Tulane dropped to 6–4.

=== UTEP ===
UTEP at Tulane

Team	1	2	3	4	Total
UTEP	0	3	0	0	3
• Tulane	14	24	7	0	45

- Location: New Orleans, LA
- Game start: 2:30 p.m. CST
- Game attendance: 19,771
- Game weather: Indoors
- Television network: CST

Tulane dominated UTEP in the program's final scheduled home game in the Superdome, scoring 38 points in the first half alone. Numerous former players from the Superdome era attended the game, and the "All-Dome Team," an all-star team of players from those 38 seasons, was introduced at halftime. The Green Wave's 45–3 victory was the largest margin of victory for Tulane in a C-USA game, and the 3 points allowed were the fewest the program had ever allowed in a C-USA contest. The win brought Tulane's record to 7–4, ensuring its first winning season since 2002. The Green Wave offense totaled 482 yards, with 205 passing and 277 rushing. The defense allowed 232 yards total and forced 3 turnovers. The team also reduced its penalties from the previous game to 4, totaling 35 yards. The win kept Tulane in contention to win the West Division of C-USA, provided it gained a victory at Rice the next week, while UTSA lost to Louisiana Tech at home.

=== Rice ===
Tulane at Rice

Team	1	2	3	4	Total
Tulane	3	0	7	3	13
• Rice	7	10	0	0	17

- Location: Houston, TX
- Game start: 2:00 p.m. CST
- Game attendance: 20,048
- Television network: FCS

This was the last conference game between Tulane and Rice. The Green Wave defense continued its above-average season by holding Rice's conference-best offense to 124 rushing yards, less than half its average coming into the game. It also forced two turnovers to place the Wave in position to score a field goal in the first half and a touchdown in the second half. The defensive effort could not make up for Tulane's offense, however, which struggled throughout the game and gained a season-low 123 yards, scoring only 3 points in the first half.

=== Louisiana–Lafayette–New Orleans Bowl ===
Tulane at Louisiana–Lafayette
(New Orleans Bowl

Team	1	2	3	4	Total
Tulane	0	14	7	0	21
• ULL	14	7	0	3	24

- Location: New Orleans, LA
- Game start: 8:00 p.m. CST
- Game weather: Indoors
- Referee: David Witvoet (Big Ten)
- Television network: ESPN

This was Tulane's first bowl game since its 36–28 Hawaiʻi Bowl win over Hawaiʻi in 2002. It was also the first all-Louisiana New Orleans Bowl game.

== After the season ==
=== Awards ===
==== C-USA All-Conference Awards ====
- Ryan Grant – First Team, Offense
- Lorenzo Doss – First Team, Defense
- Julius Warmsley – First Team, Defense
- Cairo Santos – First Team, Special Teams
- Nico Marley – co-Freshman Player of the Year
- Orleans Darkwa – Honorable Mention, Offense
- Sean Donnelly – Honorable Mention, Offense
- Zach Morgan – Honorable Mention, Offense
- Chris Davenport – Honorable Mention, Defense
- Royce LaFrance – Honorable Mention, Defense
- Jordan Batiste – Honorable Mention, Defense
- Darion Monroe – Honorable Mention, Defense
