= 2013 Rice Owls football team =

American college football season

2013 Rice Owls football

C-USA champion C-USA West Division champion

C-USA Championship Game, W 41–24 vs. Marshall

Liberty Bowl, L 7–44 vs. Mississippi State
- Conference: Conference USA
- West Division
- Record: 10–4 (7–1 C-USA)
- Head coach: David Bailiff (7th season)
- Offensive coordinator: John Reagan (3rd season)
- Offensive scheme: Spread
- Defensive coordinator: Chris Thurmond (2nd season)
- Base defense: 4–3
- Home stadium: Rice Stadium

2013 Conference USA football standings
| | Conf. | | | Overall |
| Team | W | | L | W | | L |
|---|---|---|---|---|---|---|
East Division
| Marshall x | 7 | – | 1 | 10 | – | 4 |
| East Carolina | 6 | – | 2 | 10 | – | 3 |
| Middle Tennessee | 6 | – | 2 | 8 | – | 5 |
| Florida Atlantic | 4 | – | 4 | 6 | – | 6 |
| UAB | 1 | – | 7 | 2 | – | 10 |
| Southern Miss | 1 | – | 7 | 1 | – | 11 |
| FIU | 1 | – | 7 | 1 | – | 11 |
West Division
| Rice x$ | 7 | – | 1 | 10 | – | 4 |
| UTSA | 6 | – | 2 | 7 | – | 5 |
| North Texas | 6 | – | 2 | 9 | – | 4 |
| Tulane | 5 | – | 3 | 7 | – | 6 |
| Louisiana Tech | 3 | – | 5 | 4 | – | 8 |
| Tulsa | 2 | – | 6 | 3 | – | 9 |
| UTEP | 1 | – | 7 | 2 | – | 10 |
Championship: Rice 41, Marshall 24
$ – Conference champion; x – Division champion/co-champions; Rankings from AP Poll

The 2013 Rice Owls football team represented Rice University in the 2013 NCAA Division I FBS football season. The team was led by seventh-year head coach David Bailiff and played its home games at Rice Stadium. The team was a member of the West Division of Conference USA (C-USA). They finished the season 10–4 overall, 7–1 in C-USA play, which was good for first place in the West Division. They won the C-USA championship by beating Marshall, the first-place team in the East Division, 41–24 in the C-USA conference championship game. They were invited to the AutoZone Liberty Bowl, where they lost to Mississippi State, 44–7.

== Schedule ==
| Date | Time | Opponent | Site | TV | Result | Attendance |
|---|---|---|---|---|---|---|
| August 31 | 12:00 pm | at No. 7 Texas A&M* | Kyle Field; College Station, TX | ESPN | L 31–52 | 86,686 |
| September 14 | 6:30 pm | Kansas* | Rice Stadium; Houston, TX | CBSSN | W 23–14 | 22,974 |
| September 21 | 2:00 pm | vs. Houston* | Reliant Stadium; Houston, TX (rivalry) | FSN | L 26–31 | 34,831 |
| September 28 | 6:00 pm | Florida Atlantic | Rice Stadium; Houston, TX | FCS | W 18–14 | 14,380 |
| October 5 | 2:30 pm | at Tulsa | Chapman Stadium; Tulsa, OK | CBSSN | W 30–27 ^{OT} | 20,014 |
| October 12 | 3:00 pm | at UTSA | Alamodome; San Antonio, TX | TWCS | W 27–21 | 25,272 |
| October 19 | 7:00 pm | at New Mexico State* | Aggie Memorial Stadium; Las Cruces, NM | CSNH+ | W 45–19 | 16,164 |
| October 26 | 2:30 pm | UTEP | Rice Stadium; Houston, TX | CSS | W 45–7 | 15,355 |
| October 31 | 6:30 pm | at North Texas | Apogee Stadium; Denton, TX | FS1 | L 16–28 | 22,835 |
| November 16 | 6:00 pm | Louisiana Tech^{†} | Rice Stadium; Houston, TX | CBSSN | W 52–14 | 19,707 |
| November 21 | 6:30 pm | at UAB | Legion Field; Birmingham, AL | FS1 | W 37–34 ^{OT} | 5,831 |
| November 30 | 2:00 pm | Tulane | Rice Stadium; Houston, TX | FCS | W 17–13 | 20,048 |
| December 7 | 11:00 am | Marshall | Rice Stadium; Houston, TX (C-USA Championship) | ESPN2 | W 41–24 | 20,247 |
| December 31 | 3:00 pm | vs. Mississippi State* | Liberty Bowl Memorial Stadium; Memphis, TN (Liberty Bowl) | ESPN | L 7–44 | 57,846 |
*Non-conference game; ^{†}Homecoming; Rankings from AP Poll; All times are in Central time

Schedule source:

== Game summaries ==
=== Texas A&M ===
| | 1 | 2 | 3 | 4 | Total |
|---|---|---|---|---|---|
| Rice | 14 | 7 | 0 | 10 | 31 |
| #7 Texas A&M | 7 | 21 | 10 | 14 | 52 |

== Rankings ==
Ranking movements Legend: ██ Increase in ranking ██ Decrease in ranking — = Not ranked RV = Received votes
| | Week | | | | | | | | | | | | | | | | |
| Poll | Pre | 1 | 2 | 3 | 4 | 5 | 6 | 7 | 8 | 9 | 10 | 11 | 12 | 13 | 14 | 15 | Final |
|---|---|---|---|---|---|---|---|---|---|---|---|---|---|---|---|---|---|
| AP | — | — | — | — | — | — | — | — | — | — | — | — | — | — | — | RV | — |
| Coaches | — | — | — | — | — | — | — | — | — | — | — | — | — | — | — | RV | — |
| Harris | Not released | | | | | | | — | — | — | — | — | — | — | — | RV | Not released |
| BCS | Not released | | | | | | | | — | — | — | — | — | — | — | — | Not released |
