= 2013 UTSA Roadrunners football team =

American college football season

2013 UTSA Roadrunners football
- Conference: Conference USA
- West Division
- Record: 7–5 (6–2 C-USA)
- Head coach: Larry Coker (3rd season)
- Offensive coordinator: Kevin Brown (2nd season)
- Offensive scheme: Spread
- Defensive coordinator: Neal Neathery (3rd season)
- Base defense: 4–2–5
- Home stadium: Alamodome

2013 Conference USA football standings
	Conf.			Overall
Team	W		L	W		L
East Division
Marshall x	7	–	1	10	–	4
East Carolina	6	–	2	10	–	3
Middle Tennessee	6	–	2	8	–	5
Florida Atlantic	4	–	4	6	–	6
UAB	1	–	7	2	–	10
Southern Miss	1	–	7	1	–	11
FIU	1	–	7	1	–	11
West Division
Rice x$	7	–	1	10	–	4
UTSA	6	–	2	7	–	5
North Texas	6	–	2	9	–	4
Tulane	5	–	3	7	–	6
Louisiana Tech	3	–	5	4	–	8
Tulsa	2	–	6	3	–	9
UTEP	1	–	7	2	–	10
Championship: Rice 41, Marshall 24
$ – Conference champion; x – Division champion/co-champions; Rankings from AP Poll

The 2013 UTSA Roadrunners football team represented the University of Texas at San Antonio in the 2013 NCAA Division I FBS football season. This was the third season for football at UTSA and their first as members of the Conference USA in the West Division. Larry Coker returned as the team's head coach for a third season. The Roadrunners played their home games at the Alamodome. A popular battle cry, "We'll go 99," surfaced after the New Mexico game in which UTSA drove the ball 99 yards to score a touchdown and seal the win.

== Schedule ==
Date	Time	Opponent	Site	TV	Result	Attendance
August 31	7:00 p.m.	at New Mexico*	University Stadium; Albuquerque, NM	KMYS	W 21–13	26,311
September 7	11:00 a.m.	No. 13 Oklahoma State*	Alamodome; San Antonio, TX	FS1	L 35–56	40,977
September 14	9:30 p.m.	at Arizona*	Arizona Stadium; Tucson, AZ	P12N	L 13–38	41,661
September 21	7:00 p.m.	at UTEP	Sun Bowl Stadium; El Paso, TX	FCS Atlantic	W 32–13	30,004
September 28	3:00 p.m.	Houston*	Alamodome; San Antonio, TX	FSN	L 28–59	32,487
October 5	1:00 p.m.	at Marshall	Joan C. Edwards Stadium; Huntington, WV	TWCS	L 10–34	28,837
October 12	3:00 p.m.	Rice	Alamodome; San Antonio, TX	TWCS	L 21–27	25,272
October 26	4:00 p.m.	UAB^{†}	Alamodome; San Antonio, TX	TWCS	W 52–31	25,391
November 2	2:30 p.m.	at Tulsa	Chapman Stadium; Tulsa, OK	CSS/CSNH	W 34–15	21,815
November 9	1:00 p.m.	Tulane	Alamodome; San Antonio, TX	WOAI	W 10–7	24,606
November 23	2:30 p.m.	at North Texas	Apogee Stadium; Denton, TX	TWCS	W 21–13	19,335
November 30	2:30 p.m.	Louisiana Tech	Alamodome; San Antonio, TX	CSS/CSNH	W 30–10	26,549
*Non-conference game; ^{†}Homecoming; Rankings from AP Poll; All times are in Central time

Schedule source:

== Roster ==
2013 UTSA Roadrunners football team roster
Players
Coaches
Offense

Pos.	#	Name	Class
WR	1	Kam Jones (C)	Jr
QB	2	Zach Conque	Fr
QB	3	Austin Robinson	Fr
QB	4	Coleman Treston	Fr
WR	5	Brandon Armstrong	Jr
QB	6	Tucker Carter	Jr
QB	8	Eric Soza (C)	Sr
WR	9	Marcellus Mack	Jr
WR	10	Davis Rileigh	Fr
RB	11	David Glasco II (C)	Jr
FR	11	Brady Jones	Fr
WR	12	Earon Holmes	Jr
RB	13	Brian Vaughn	So
QB	14	Travis Menn	Jr
WR	15	Josiah Monroe	Jr
QB	16	John Simmons	Jr
WR	17	Aron Taylor	Fr
WR	18	Kenny Harrison	Jr
WR	19	Sean Hesler	So
RB	20	Wesley Greene	Fr
TE	23	Blake Dean	So
RB	27	Nate Shaw	Jr
RB	28	Terrance Wilburn	So
RB	29	Jarveon Williams	Fr
RB	36	Evans Okotcha	Sr
RB	39	Jerry Bynum	Fr
RB	41	CheRod Simpson	Sr
RB	44	George Schwanenberg	Fr
TE	46	Cade Laufer	So
G	51	Payton Rion	Jr
C	55	Nate Leonard (C)	Jr
C	60	Juan Perez	Jr
C	62	Breyun Owens	Fr
C	63	Will Cavanaugh	So
G	65	Michael Roberson	So
OT	66	Zach Hester	So
G	67	Kyle McKinney	Fr
OT	68	Cody Harris	Jr
C	69	Brent Swanson	Fr
OT	70	Jordan Gray	So
G	71	Cody Cole	Fr
OT	72	Kris Salinas	Fr
OT	74	Reed Darragh	Fr
OT	76	Josh Walker	Jr
C	77	Jay Craft II	So
OT	77	Alex Delgado	Fr
G	79	Scott Inskeep	Jr
WR	80	Cole Hicks	Sr
TE	80	Tyrell Clay	Fr
WR	81	Kenny Bias	So
TE	82	David Morgan II (C)	So
TE	83	Cole Hubble	Jr
WR	84	Brandon Freeman	Jr
TE	85	Jeremiah Moeller	Sr
WR	86	Seth Grubb	Jr
TE	87	Trevor Stevens	Fr
WR	88	Aaron Grubb	So
WR	89	Miles Lerch	Fr
TE	93	Kevin Hartley	Sr

Defense

Pos.	#	Name	Class
CB	2	Kevin Adams	Jr
S	3	Cody Berry	Sr
CB	4	Crosby Adams III	Jr
CB	6	Aneas Henricks	Fr
S	7	Triston Wade (C)	Jr
S	8	Michael Egquagu	Fr
S	10	Brain King	Jr
S	14	Bailey N'Keal	Fr
S	16	Dondre Dobbins	Fr
CB	19	Darrick Watkins	So
CB	20	Andre Brown	Jr
CB	21	Bennett Okotcha	So
S	22	Nic Johnston (C)	Jr
S	23	Tevin Broussard	Jr
CB	24	Darrien Starling	Jr
S	25	Mauricio Sanchez	Jr
CB	26	Trevor Baker	Jr
CB	29	Fred Blow	Sr
S	30	Justin Chavez	Fr
S	31	Joseph Lizcano	Jr
LB	32	Drew Douglas	So
S	33	Chase Dahlquist	Fr
LB	34	Tank O'Neal	Fr
S	35	Ragan Robichaux	Sr
DE	40	William Ritter	Sr
LB	42	Jens Jeters	Jr
DE	43	Cody Rogers	Jr
LB	44	Steven Kurfehs (C)	Sr
DE	45	Justyn Eddins	Sr
S	48	Gage Hadlock	Fr
DE	50	Robert Singletary	Jr
LB	52	Blake Terry	Jr
LB	53	Marcos Curry	Fr
LB	54	Brandon Guerrero	Jr
LB	56	Dalton Miler	So
DT	58	Ferrington Macon (C)	Jr
DT	61	Richard Burge	Jr
DT	73	John Paul Davila	Fr
DT	75	Anthony Lee Jr.	Fr
DT	78	Kennedy Ubabuike	Jr
DE	90	Jarron Harris	Sr
DT	91	Brian Price	So
DE	94	Codie Brooks	Fr
DE	96	Jason Neill	Jr
DT	97	Ashaad Mabry	Jr
DE	98	Kennan Davis	So
DE	99	Nelson Skylar	Fr

Special teams

Pos.	#	Name	Class
PK, P	13	Daniel Portillo	Fr
P, PK	38	Kristian Stern	Jr
PK, P	47	Josh Ward	Jr
DS	49	Matt Bayliss	Fr
DS	57	Drew Johnson	Fr
PK, P	92	Sean Ianno (C)	Jr
DS	95	Jesse Medrano	Jr

Head coach

- Larry Coker

Coordinators/assistant coaches

- Kevin Brown
  Offensive coordinator/quarterbacks
- Perry Eliano
  Special teams coordinator/safeties
- Polo Gutierrez
  Runningbacks
- Tony Jeffery
  Receivers
- Jim Marshall
  Offensive linemen
- Neal Neathery
  Defensive coordinator/linebackers
- Jeff Popovich
  Cornerbacks
- Charlie Reeve
  Tight ends
- Eric Roark
  Defensive linemen

Legend

- (C) Team captain
- (S) Suspended
- (I) Ineligible
- Injured
- Redshirt

Roster
Last update: September 22, 2013

== Depth chart ==
Defense

S
Nic Johnston
Michael Egwuagu

FS
Triston Wade
Tevin Broussard

WLB	SLB
⋅	⋅
⋅	⋅

SS
Cody Berry
Brian King

CB
Crosby Adam
Andre Brown

DE	DT	DT	DE
Cody Rogers	Ashaad Mabry	Richard Burge	Codie Brooks
William Ritter	Brian Price	Ferrington Macon	Jarron Harris

CB
Bennett Okotcha
Darrien Starling

Offense

WR
Earon Holmes
Brandon Freeman

WR
Aaron Grubb
Kenny Harrison

LT	LG	C	RG	RT
Cody Harris	Scott Inskeep	Nate Leonard	Payton Rion	Josh Walker
Cody Cole	William Cavanaugh	Juan Perez	Zach Hester	Jordan Gray

TE
Jeremiah Moeller
Cole Hubble

WR
Kam Jones
Marcellus Mark

QB
Eric Soza
Tucker Carter

Key reserves
Evans Okotcha (TB)
Jarveon Williams (FB)
Aaron Grubb (KR/PR/H)
Matt Bayliss (LS)
Brandon Armstrong (RB)

RB
David Glasco II
Nate Shaw

Special teams
PK Sean Ianno
PK Josh Ward
P Kristian Stern
KR Kam Jones
PR Kenny Harrison
LS Jesse Medrano
H Seth Grubb

== Game summaries ==
=== New Mexico ===
UTSA at New Mexico

Team	1	2	3	4	Total
• Roadrunners	0	7	7	7	21
Lobos	6	7	0	0	13

- Date: August 31
- Location: University Stadium
  Albuquerque, NM
- Game start: 6:07 p.m. MST
- Elapsed time: 2:57
- Game attendance: 26,311
- Game weather: 92 °F (33 °C), Clear, winds S at 16mph
- Referee: Rodney Burnette
- TV announcers (KMYS): Jay Howard and David Williams

Scoring summary
1	11:11	UNM	SaQwan Edwards 45-yard fumble recovery, Carlos Wiggins rush failed	UNM 6–0
2	11:42	UNM	Marquis Bundy 37-yard touchdown pass from Cole Gautsche, Justus Adams kick good	UNM 13–0
2	3:10	UTSA	David Glasco II 1-yard touchdown run, Sean Ianno kick good	UNM 13–7
3	12:17	UTSA	Brandon Armstrong 38-yard touchdown pass from Eric Soza, Sean Ianno kick good	UTSA 14–13
4	3:00	UTSA	David Glasco II 8-yard touchdown pass from Eric Soza, Sean Ianno kick good	UTSA 21–13

=== #13 Oklahoma State ===
Oklahoma State at UTSA

Team	1	2	3	4	Total
• #13 Cowboys	14	21	7	14	56
Roadrunners	7	0	0	28	35

- Date: September 7
- Location: Alamodome
  San Antonio, TX
- Game start: 11:00 a.m. CST
- Elapsed time: 3:40
- Game attendance: 40,977
- Game weather: 72 °F (22 °C), Indoors
- Referee: Dan Romeo
- TV announcers (FS1): Justin Kutcher, James Bates and Brady Poppinga

Scoring summary
1	9:59	OSU	Jhajuan Seales 10-yard touchdown pass from J. W. Walsh, Ben Grogan kick good	OSU 7–0
1	4:22	UTSA	Kenny Bias 6-yard touchdown run, Sean Ianno kick good	Tie 7–7
1	2:14	OSU	Shamiel Gary 20-yard touchdown pass from J.W. Walsh, Ben Grogan kick good	OSU 14–7
2	11:22	OSU	Josh Stewart 10-yard touchdown pass from J.W. Walsh, Ben Grogan kick good	OSU 21–7
2	4:53	OSU	J.W. Walsh 4-yard touchdown run, Ben Grogan kick good	OSU 28–7
2	0:56	OSU	Jeremy Smith 1-yard touchdown run, Ben Grogan kick good	OSU 35–7
3	9:47	OSU	Blake Jackson 22-yard touchdown pass from J.W. Walsh, Ben Grogan kick good	OSU 42–7
4	14:10	UTSA	Cole Hubble 10-yard touchdown pass from Eric Soza, Sean Ianno kick good	OSU 42–14
4	12:15	UTSA	Kenny Bias 19-yard touchdown pass from Eric Soza, Sean Ianno kick good	OSU 42–21
4	10:11	OSU	Charlie Moore 33-yard touchdown pass from Clint Chelf, Ben Grogan kick good	OSU 49–21
4	9:24	UTSA	Kenny Boas 67-yard touchdown pass from Eric Soza, Sean Ianno kick good	OSU 49–28
4	5:27	OSU	Desmond Roland 21-yard touchdown pass from Clint Chelf, Ben Grogan kick good	OSU 56–28
4	1:14	UTSA	Aaron Grubb 15-yard touchdown pass from Tucker Carter, Sean Ianno kick good	OSU 56–35

=== Arizona ===
UTSA at Arizona

Team	1	2	3	4	Total
Roadrunners	3	3	0	7	13
• Wildcats	14	10	7	7	38

- Date: September 14
- Location: Arizona Stadium
  Tiscon, AZ
- Game start: 7:34 a.m. MST
- Elapsed time: 3:03
- Game attendance: 41,661
- Game weather: 91 °F (33 °C), Mostly Clear, 21% Humidity, Wind NE 2mph
- Referee: Jack Wood
- TV announcers (Pac-12): Roxy Bernstein and Anthony Herron

Scoring summary
1	10:13	UTSA	Sean Ianno 34-yard Field Goal	UTSA 3–0
1	6:14	ARIZ	Samajie Grant 13-yard touchdown pass from B. J. Denker, Jake Smith kick good	ARIZ 7–3
1	3:03	ARIZ	B. J. Denker 35-yard touchdown run, Jake Smith kick good	ARIZ 14–3
2	14:09	ARIZ	Jake Smith 23-yard Field Goal	ARIZ 17–3
2	8:35	UTSA	Sean Ianno 43-yard Field Goal	ARIZ 17–6
2	2:57	ARIZ	Ka'Deem Carey 4-yard touchdown run, Jake Smith kick good	ARIZ 24–6
3	11:43	ARIZ	B. J. Denker 1-yard touchdown run, Jake Smith kick good	ARIZ 31–6
4	13:57	ARIZ	Ka'deem Carey 7-yard touchdown run, Jake Smith kick good	ARIZ 38–6
4	9:39	UTSA	Davis Glasco II 4-yard touchdown run, Sean Ianno kick good	ARIZ 38–13

=== UTEP ===
UTSA at UTEP

Team	1	2	3	4	Total
• Roadrunners	7	18	0	7	32
Miners	10	0	3	0	13

- Date: September 21
- Location: Sun Bowl Stadium
  El Paso, TX
- Game start: 6:05 p.m. MST
- Elapsed time: 3:10
- Game attendance: 30,004
- Game weather: 76 °F (24 °C), Clear, Wind E 10mph
- Referee: Clay Martin
- TV announcers (FCS Atlantic): Brendan Burke, Ben Leber & Lesley McCaslin

Scoring summary
1	11:10	UTSA	Brandon Armstrong 29-yard touchdown run, Sean Ianno kick good	UTSA 7–0
1	10:57	UTEP	Autrey Golden 100-yard kickoff return run, Jay Mattox kick good	Tied 7–7
1	1:28	UTEP	Jay Mattow 28-yard Field Goal	UTEP 10–7
2	12:18	UTSA	Kam Jones 28-yard touchdown run, Seth Grubb rush good	UTSA 15–10
2	3:34	UTSA	Sean Ianno 37-yard Field Goal	UTSA 18–10
2	1:28	UTSA	Cole Hubble 17-yard touchdown pass from Eric Soza, Sean Ianno kick good	UTSA 25–10
3	00:39	UTEP	Jay Mattow 24-yard Field Goal	UTSA 25–13
4	9:39	UTSA	Davis Glasco II 17-yard touchdown run, Sean Ianno kick good	UTSA 32–13

=== Houston ===
Houston at UTSA

Team	1	2	3	4	Total
• Cougars	7	14	10	28	59
Roadrunners	7	14	7	0	28

- Date: September 28
- Location: Alamodome
  San Antonio, TX
- Game start: 3:05 p.m. CST
- Elapsed time: 3:43
- Game attendance: 32,487
- Game weather: 72 °F (22 °C), Indoors
- Referee: Tracy Jones
- TV announcers (FSN): Mark Followill, Brian Baldinger & JC Pearson

Scoring summary
1	8:40	UTSA	Kam Jones 12-yard touchdown pass from Eric Soza, Sean Ianno kick good	UTSA 7–0
1	1:42	UH	Ryan Jackson 15-ard touchdown pass from John O'Korn, Richie Leone kick good	Tied 7–7
2	13:07	UH	Greg Ward Jr. 6-yard touchdown run, Richie Leone kick good	UH 14–7
2	5:45	UTSA	Eric Soza 1-yard touchdown run, Sean Ianno kick good	Tied 14–14
2	2:30	UH	Xavier Maxwell 7-yard touchdown pass from John O'Korne, Richie Leone kick good	UH 21–14
2	1:18	UTSA	Earon Holmes 6-yard touchdown pass from Eric Soza, Sean Ianno kick good	Tied 21–21
3	7:22	UH	Richie Leone 25-yard Field Goal	UH 24–21
3	3:11	UH	Brandon Wilson 78-yard touchdown return off of blocked Field Goal, Richie Leone kick good	UH 31–21
3	0:47	UTSA	David Glasco II 2-yard touchdown run, Sean Ianno kick good	UH 31–28
4	14:12	UH	Xavier Maxwell 22-yard touchdown pass from John O'Korne, Richie Leone kick good	UH 38–28
4	7:12	UH	Deontay Greenbury 20-yard touchdown pass from John O'Korne, Richie Leone kick good	UH 45–28
4	3:09	UH	Justin Hicks 15-yard touchdown run, Richie Leone kick good	UH 52–28
4	0:46	UH	William Jackson 96-yard Interception return for a touchdown, Richie Leone kick good	UH 59–28
