= 2013 Liberty Bowl =

2013 AutoZone Liberty Bowl
- 55th Liberty Bowl
Rice Owls	Mississippi State Bulldogs
(10–3)	(6–6)
C-USA	SEC
7	44
Head coach: David Bailiff	Head coach: Dan Mullen
	1	2	3	4	Total
Rice	7	0	0	0	7
Mississippi State	7	20	14	3	44
- Date: December 31, 2013
- Season: 2013
- Stadium: Liberty Bowl Memorial Stadium
- Location: Memphis, Tennessee
- MVP: Dak Prescott (QB, Mississippi State)
- Favorite: Mississippi State by 7
- Referee: Ron Cherry (ACC)
- Attendance: 57,846
- Payout: US$1.2 million per team

United States TV coverage
- Network: ESPN
- Announcers: Bob Wischusen (play-by-play); Rod Gilmore (analyst); Quint Kessenich (sideline)

The 2013 Liberty Bowl was a college football postseason bowl game played on December 31, 2013, at Liberty Bowl Memorial Stadium in Memphis, Tennessee. The 55th edition of the Liberty Bowl, it featured the Rice Owls, the champions of Conference USA and the Mississippi State Bulldogs of the Southeastern Conference. It began at 3:00 p.m. CST and aired on ESPN. It was one of the 2013–14 bowl games that concluded the 2013 FBS football season. Sponsored by automobile parts and accessories store AutoZone, it was officially known as the AutoZone Liberty Bowl. Mississippi State defeated Rice by a score of 44–7.

The Bulldogs accepted their invitation after finishing the regular season 6–6, while the Owls advanced by virtue of winning the C-USA Championship Game over Marshall, 41–24.

== Teams ==
This was the second meeting between Rice and Mississippi State's football teams; the Bulldogs won the first matchup in 1975 by a score of 28–14, but were later forced to forfeit that game among others during the 1975 through 1977 seasons for NCAA rules violations. The Bulldogs were invited to the game likely in part due to their proximity and past attendance; in 2007, the Bulldogs played in the bowl and filled the stands with a record 63,816 fans.

=== Rice ===
Continuing their success from the previous season which saw them finish 6–6 and win the 2012 Armed Forces Bowl over the Air Force Falcons by a score of 33–14, the Owls did even better in the 2013 season. Already having won the Conference USA's West Division championship, the Owls went on to win the 2013 Conference USA Football Championship Game, defeating the Marshall Thundering Herd by a score of 41–24, advancing to the Liberty Bowl by virtue of their victory. In addition to being Rice's first Liberty Bowl, this is set to be the final Liberty Bowl to feature representation from Conference USA, as that tie-in will go to the Big 12 Conference from 2014 until at least 2019.

=== Mississippi State ===
After finishing the previous season 8–4 and losing the Gator Bowl to the Northwestern Wildcats by a score of 34–20, the Bulldogs declined somewhat in the next season, finishing 6–6 overall and 3–5 in conference play, tied with rival Ole Miss for fifth place in the SEC's Western Division. Nonetheless, that was sufficient for bowl director Steve Ehrhart to extend an invitation to the Bulldogs. This will be Mississippi State's record–tying fourth Liberty Bowl; the Bulldogs are currently 2–1 in the game, having won the 1963 game over the NC State Wolfpack by a score of 16–12, lost the 1991 game to Air Force Falcons 38–15, and won the 2007 game over the UCF Knights 10–3.

== Pregame buildup ==
A plurality of college football analysts predicted that Mississippi State (MSU) would emerge victorious, including Pat Forde of Yahoo Sports, all six panelists from CBS Sports (although four of the six predicted that Rice would cover the 7-point spread), and Randy Chambers, a featured columnist for Bleacher Report. Chambers commented,

This should end up being one of the better bowl games of this season ... but for the sake of a prediction, you have to go with Mississippi State. It's the team that's a lot more balanced offensively and has seemed to have found a rhythm ... Rice has been on fire, winning nine of its last 10, but the lack of competition is a concern. The Owls are in for their toughest battle yet and may not have enough athletes to compete with a team from the SEC. Mississippi State is too big, too strong and too fast.

CBS's Tony Moss concurred, noting, "Rice was a consistent winner this year and Mississippi State became bowl-eligible by the skin of its teeth. Still, it's hard to imagine a team that snuck by the likes of UAB and FAU beating someone from the SEC." Statistically, MSU held a slight edge in total offense and rushing yards allowed per game, and a significant edge in passing yards per game, whereas Rice held edges in points scored and points allowed per game, rushing yards per game, total yards allowed per game, and passing yards allowed per game.

=== Rice ===
During bowl practices, coach David Bailiff commented that, to prepare for the cowbells utilized by Bulldogs' fans, the team simulated the noise: "I think we have a good plan for the cowbells. We've got the CDs of the cowbells going off (at practice). We're looking forward to it." Conversely to MSU, Rice's pre-bowl practices were "sharp", according to Bailiff. During the season, the Owls lost two of their first three games, including the Bayou Bucket Classic to Houston, but after that, won five consecutive games, including an overtime win against Tulsa. They lost to North Texas on Halloween, before winning their final four games, including an overtime win against UAB, and a victory in the 2013 Conference USA Football Championship Game against Marshall.

==== Offense ====
Larry Edmondson was the Owls' offensive coordinator entering the bowl game as his first game coordinating after the departure of John Reagan, who coordinated the offense during the season, but left after the conference championship game to be the offensive coordinator and offensive line coach for Kansas, and led the offense to posting 185.5 passing yards per game (101st in FBS), 240.2 rushing yards per game (15th in FBS), 31.4 points per game (52nd in FBS). Three-year starter Taylor McHargue, a fifth-year senior who was "a productive and steady signal-caller", started at quarterback for the owls, posting 2,261 passing yards (fifth in the conference) for 17 touchdowns (third in the conference) and 8 interceptions (tenth-most in conference). Despite missing two games due to a knee injury, senior running back Charles Ross mustered 1,252 rushing yards (second in the conference) and earning first team all-conference accolades; he rushed for 14 touchdowns, which led the conference. McHargue was second on the team in rushing, totaling 466 yards and 5 touchdowns, and freshman Jawon Davis rushed for 455 yards and 3 touchdowns. Luke Turner, who was listed second on the depth chart, and Turner Petersen, who started when Ross was injured but ultimately sustained an injury himself thus rendering himself out for the season, also contributed.

Junior wide receiver Jordan Taylor, a second team all-conference performer who measured 6 feet 5 inches (1.96 m) and weighed 210 pounds (95 kg), led the team with 54 receptions, more than twice the second-leading receiver, adding 846 yards and 8 touchdowns. Secondarily, sophomore Dennis Parks totaled 26 catches, 470 yards, and 3 touchdowns. Petersen was the third-leading receiver. Senior Donte Moore started 11 of the 12 games, and was fourth on the team with 20 catches for 299 yards and 1 touchdown. At tight end, freshman Connor Cella made seven starts (all the games in which a tight end started, Cella started – they began in alternate formations when Cella did not start), and totaled 12 receptions for 111 yards and 1 touchdown. On the offensive line, bookends Jon Hodde, a senior left tackle, and Caleb Williams, a sophomore right tackle, fostered stability on the line, each starting all of the Owls' regular season games. At guard, juniors Nico Carlson and Drew Carroll started at left and right guard respectively; Carlson started 11 of 12 games, being replaced once by Carroll, and Carroll started a total of 4 games, 3 of them at right guard, replacing Andrew Reue. Senior center Nate Richards attained all-conference accolades, and started all of the games for Rice during the regular season. Second team all-conference performer Chris Boswell started at kicker, making 14 of his 21 attempts with a long of 56 yards.

==== Defense ====
Utilizing predominantly a 4-2-5 defense in which they played single coverage on the outside and strived to pressure the quarterback, Chris Thurmond was the defensive coordinator, and led the defense to averaging 352.2 yards per game, which ranked 24th in the FBS, and 22.9 points per game, which ranked 33rd in the FBS. There was much fluctuation in the starting lineup on the defensive line, however the one consistent starter was Christian Covington, a sophomore first team all-conference honoree at defensive tackle who totaled 51 tackles, 9.5 TFL, and 4 sacks. Sophomore Ross Winship entered the game first on the depth chart at nose tackle, having started there in the previous five games; he totaled 20 tackles during the season. At end, fifth-year senior Cody Bauer entered the game as the starter; he led the defense with 4.5 sacks on the season to complement 9.5 TFL and 34 tackles. At the other end spot, seniors Tanner Leland and Josh Skinner both saw playing time, but Leland was the predominant starter.

The two linebacker spots were filled by undersized (205 pounds (93 kg)) senior Michael Kutzler, a second team all-conference performer who led the defense in tackles with 86 tackles, and junior James Radcliffe, who totaled 58 tackles. An SB Nation preview called linebacker the "weak" point of the Owls' defense. That same preview gave Rice the edge at both cornerback and safety in the secondary. At cornerback, they featured two all-conference performers – fifth-year senior Phillip Gaines, who achieved first team commendation with a team-leading four interceptions to complement 34 tackles and 4 TFL, and junior Bryce Callahan, who started all 12 regular season games and achieved second team commendation with 32 tackles, 3 TFL, and 3 interceptions. In their 4–2–5 set, they started three safeties. The same trio started each of the final seven games – fifth-year senior Paul Porras at the "KAT" spot, totaling 76 tackles (second on the team), junior Julius White at free safety, totaling 59 tackles (third on the team) and 2 interceptions, and junior Malcolm Hill at strong safety, totaling 44 tackles (fifth on the team), 3 interceptions, and 2.5 TFL.

=== Mississippi State ===
The Bulldogs, who, over Christmas, took a five-day hiatus from what was a "distracted" series of practices, finished their preparations for the bowl game looking to match a three-game losing streak that they suffered towards the end of the season with a three-game winning streak including the bowl game. They began the season losing two of their first three games, including a loss to then unranked, but eventual 2014 BCS National Championship Game participant Auburn. They went on to win three of their next four before skidding onto the aforementioned three game losing streak. They concluded the regular season with wins against Arkansas and Ole Miss in the Egg Bowl.

==== Offense ====
Coordinated by Les Koenning, the Bulldogs' spread offense averaged 240.3 passing yards per game, 185.8 rushing yards per game, and 26.3 points per game, averages that ranked 56th, 45th, and 80th respectively. Though three different quarterbacks – sophomore Dak Prescott, senior Tyler Russell, and freshman Damian Williams – started games and split time throughout the season, Prescott was the starter heading into the bowl after a strong performance in the 2013 Egg Bowl. Prescott totaled 1,657 passing yards, 7 touchdowns, and 7 interceptions on the season. Prescott also led the Bulldogs' rushing attack, totaling 751 rushing yards for 11 touchdowns on the season, the latter of which led SEC quarterbacks. Senior LaDarius Perkins started at running back, and totaled 495 rushing yards and 2 touchdowns on the season. Wide receiver Jameon Lewis contributed multilaterally, completing three passes, all for touchdowns, rushing for three touchdowns on a total of 13 carries, and catching five touchdown passes on 55 total catches for 703 yards. Junior Robert Johnson and sophomore Joe Morrow were the other predominant starters at wide receiver, with the former of whom finishing second on the team with 33 receptions for 379 yards, and the former of whom finishing sixth on the team with 18 receptions for 211 yards; Johnson caught no touchdowns, while Morrow caught one. Freshman De'Runnya Wilson made one start at wide receiver, and finished fourth on the team with 23 receptions for 314 yards and 3 touchdowns. Two junior tight ends – Malcolm Johnson and Brandon Hill – the former of whom focused predominantly on receiving whereas the latter of whom focused predominantly on blocking, started at various points throughout the season.

Continuity was prevalent on the offensive line, as the group featured only four different starting combinations during the season, and three of the four lasted only one game (in other words, the same group of starters started 9 of their 12 games). The group was anchored by star left guard Gabe Jackson, who did not allow a sack all season, and was named both an All-American and All-SEC performer by various media outlets at the season's conclusion. Rod Gilmore, the game's analyst, described Jackson's prospects for the 2014 NFL draft as follows: "Gabe Jackson will be playing on Sundays, guaranteed. The only question is how high he goes in the NFL Draft." Chris Low commented, "The top guard in the SEC going into the season, the 6-foot-4, 335-pound Jackson is a true road-grader. He combines size, power and strength and has been a fixture at left guard for the Bulldogs since his redshirt freshman season." Scouts Inc., a subsidiary of ESPN, rated him the second-best guard prospect for the draft. Senior right tackle Charles Siddoway started all 12 games as well.

==== Defense ====
The Bulldogs' 4-3 defense was coordinated by Geoff Collins, and surrendered an average of 366.3 yards per game and 24.3 points per game, both of which were well within the top third of Football Bowl Subdivision (FBS) schools. The defense was anchored by a strong defensive line that included freshman defensive tackle Chris Jones, whom ESPN writer Chris Low described as "freakishly big, athletic, and disruptive", as well as "one of the most promising freshman defensive linemen in the country", senior defensive end Denico Autry, a community college transfer who totaled 72 tackles, 15 tackles for loss (TFL), 5 sacks, 2 forced fumbles (FF), and 1 interception (INT) on the season, junior Kaleb Eulls, who though he was a two-year starter at defensive end ultimately transferred to defensive tackle at the onset of the season so that, according to Bulldogs' defensive line coach David Turner, the Bulldogs could "get the best four guys on the field and he is one of them", and junior defensive end Preston Smith, who totaled 38 tackles, 6.5 TFL, and 2.5 sacks on the season. Junior P.J. Jones was actually the predominant starter at defensive tackle (ahead of Chris Jones – no relation between the two), but missed some time due to injury.

At linebacker, another of the defense's strong points, sophomore Benardick McKinney, who measured 6 feet 5 inches (1.96 m) 235 pounds (107 kg), led the defense in tackles with 72, adding 6 TFL, and 2.5 sacks. Senior Deontae Skinner, who though he was inexplicably unlisted on the bowl game depth chart, (he missed time at the end of the season due to injury, but was expected to play in the bowl game, at least by external media) was second on the defense with 61 tackles. Junior Matt Wells was the unit's third starter, totaling 49 tackles on the season. In the secondary, MSU's starters developed over the season, particularly at cornerback, where junior Jamerson Love, sophomore Taveze Calhoun, and Will Redmond all saw significant time. Despite the improvement at cornerback, there was concern at safety for the Bulldogs, primarily because of season-ending surgery underwent by leader Nickoe Whitley after their final game; in his absence, redshirt freshman Deontay Evans and sophomore Kendrick Market, the latter of whom was third on the defense in tackles with 60, were the starters. Overall, one preview noted MSU's defense had an edge over Rice's because of a strong front seven that, during games against tough opponents, was "battle tested against the nastiest OLs in the country".

== Game summary ==
=== Broadcast ===
ESPN broadcast the game on television, with Bob Wischusen, Rod Gilmore, and Quint Kessenich providing play-by-play, analysis, and sideline coverage respectively. On ESPN Radio, Beth Mowins provided play-by-play, Joey Galloway analysis, and Paul Carcaterra sideline coverage. Each team also had its own radio coverage. For Mississippi State, Jim Ellis handled play-by-play, Matt Wyatt provided analysis, and John Correro reported from the sideline on the Mississippi State Radio Network, and for Rice, J. P. Heath provided play-by-play, Nate Griffin provided analysis, and Jorge Vargas reported from the sideline.

=== First quarter ===
Rice received the opening kickoff, and embarked on a drive during which they were faced with a key decision on fourth down and six at Mississippi State's (MSU) 41-yard line; ultimately they decided to punt, pinning MSU at their own 11-yard line. On 3rd down and 10 for MSU on their drive, Dak Prescott completed a pass to Robert Johnson, who appeared to have a first down, but while fighting for extra yardage, fumbled, and Rice recovered around the same place where their previous drive ended. They were quickly faced with a fourth down and one, and lined up to go for it, and converted. Several plays later, they were faced with a second down and goal, and scored on a 1-yard touchdown run by Charles Ross. MSU gained significant yardage on their drive, entering the red zone, and ultimately scored on a 10-yard pass from Prescott to Ladarius Perkins to culminate a 10-play, 73-yard drive that encapsulated 4:40, tying the game at 7. On the final full drive of the quarter, Rice punted. At the end of the quarter, MSU had the ball around their own 40-yard line.

=== Second quarter ===
Taking advantage of several third down conversions, the Bulldogs executed a 10-play, 64-yard drive that ended when Ashton Shumpert rushed for a 1-yard touchdown, taking the lead for MSU. Rice's ensuing drive was decimated by a chop-block penalty, and ultimately they were forced to punt after going three-and-out. MSU capitalized on the ensuing drive, scoring via a screen pass to Malcolm Johnson; the PAT was blocked. Hoping to avert a blowout, Rice took the field at their own 25-yard line after a touchback. On a play during which they converted a first down, they got 15 additional yards thanks to a personal foul penalty, thus advancing them into MSU territory. The advancement was to little avail, as a sack on fourth down gave MSU the ball back near midfield. After the play, however, MSU was assessed with a 15-yard unsportsmanlike conduct penalty, backing up their field position to the 30-yard line. It did not stop MSU; after a 65-yard pass to Jameon Lewis, they were inside the Rice 10-yard line, and a few plays later, the rout commenced with another MSU touchdown; the extra point was good, and at the half, MSU led 27–7, having scored 27 unanswered points since Rice scored early in the first quarter.

=== Third quarter ===
In the third quarter Mississippi State extended the lead they held at halftime to 34 points on TD runs of 5 and 11 yards by Prescott, capping off drives of 61 and 57 yards respectively. In the quarter the Bulldogs had 150 yards of offense while holding the Owls to 15.

=== Fourth quarter ===
The Bulldogs capped off the scoring when kicker Taylor Earhart came on and Kicked a 19-yard field goal with 4:45 remaining. It was the only field goal attempt of the Memphis Metro area (Olive Branch, Mississippi) native's Mississippi State career. Taylor walked-on at MSU after playing the first two years of his college career at Northeast Mississippi Community College.

=== Scoring summary ===
Scoring summary

Quarter	Time	Drive			Team	Scoring information	Score	
Quarter	Time	Plays	Yards	TOP	Team	Scoring information	Rice	Mississippi State
1	6:41	9	45	4:05	RICE	Charles Ross 1-yard touchdown run, Chris Boswell kick good	7	0
1	2:01	10	73	4:40	MSU	LaDarius Perkins 10-yard touchdown reception from Dak Prescott, Evan Sobiesk kick good	7	7
2	9:49	10	64	5:33	MSU	Ashton Shumpert 1-yard touchdown run, Sobiesk kick good	7	14
2	4:32	7	64	2:33	MSU	Malcolm Johnson 13-yard touchdown reception from Prescott, Sobiesk kick no good (blocked)	7	20
2	0:10	5	55	1:15	MSU	Artimas Samuel 4-yard touchdown reception from Prescott, Sobiesk kick good	7	27
3	7:25	5	61	2:12	MSU	Prescott 5-yard touchdown run, Sobiesk kick good	7	34
3	1:42	4	57	1:57	MSU	Prescott 11-yard touchdown run, Sobiesk kick good	7	41
4	4:45	6	28	4:09	MSU	19-yard field goal by Taylor Earhart	7	44
"TOP" = time of possession. For other American football terms, see Glossary of American football.							7	44

=== Statistics ===
Statistics	Rice	MS
First downs	7	27
Total offense, plays - yards	48-145	76–533
Rushes-yards (net)	32-61	46–239
Passing yards (net)	84	294
Passes, Comp-Att-Int	16–8–0	30–18–0
Time of Possession	24:42	35:18
