= 2013 Conference USA Football Championship Game =

- Conference Championship
Marshall Thundering Herd	Rice Owls
(9–3)	(9–3)
24	41
Head coach: John "Doc" Holliday	Head coach: David Bailiff
	1	2	3	4	Total
Marshall	0	10	0	14	24
Rice	14	7	13	7	41
- Date: December 7, 2013
- Season: 2013
- Stadium: Rice Stadium
- Location: Houston, Texas
- MVP: Luke Turner (RB, Rice)
- Favorite: Marshall by 6.5
- Referee: Brad Rogers
- Attendance: 20,247

United States TV coverage
- Network: ESPN2
- Announcers: Joe Tessitore, Matt Millen, and Maria Taylor

2013 Conference USA football standings
	Conf.			Overall
Team	W		L	W		L
East Division
Marshall x	7	–	1	10	–	4
East Carolina	6	–	2	10	–	3
Middle Tennessee	6	–	2	8	–	5
Florida Atlantic	4	–	4	6	–	6
UAB	1	–	7	2	–	10
Southern Miss	1	–	7	1	–	11
FIU	1	–	7	1	–	11
West Division
Rice x$	7	–	1	10	–	4
UTSA	6	–	2	7	–	5
North Texas	6	–	2	9	–	4
Tulane	5	–	3	7	–	6
Louisiana Tech	3	–	5	4	–	8
Tulsa	2	–	6	3	–	9
UTEP	1	–	7	2	–	10
Championship: Rice 41, Marshall 24
$ – Conference champion; x – Division champion/co-champions; Rankings from AP Poll

The 2013 Conference USA Football Championship Game, which determined the 2013 football champion of Conference USA (C-USA), was played at noon Eastern Standard Time (11 am local time and 1700 UTC) on December 7 at Rice Stadium in Houston. The game featured the winners of the conference's East division, the Marshall Thundering Herd, and the winners of the West division, the Rice Owls.

Under C-USA rules, the championship game would be played at the home stadium of the team with the best record in conference play. Since Marshall and Rice both finished with 7–1 records in conference play, and did not play one another in the regular season, the site was chosen based on the BCS rankings on December 1. Although only 25 teams are explicitly ranked, the ranking formula can be used to determine the relative rankings of any two teams in the Football Bowl Subdivision. Accordingly, Rice received home-field advantage.

Rice represented C-USA in the 2013 Liberty Bowl on December 31 in Memphis, Tennessee after defeating Marshall by 17 points.

== History ==
In the 2012 Championship Game Tulsa defeated former conference member UCF (University of Central Florida) in overtime, 33–27 in Tulsa, Oklahoma.

After the 2013 Conference USA realignment, C-USA added six new members for the 2013 season after losing four members, including UCF, to the American Athletic Conference.

After the 2013 season, the ninth C-USA championship game was played in Houston, Texas for the third time since 2011, when the Houston Cougars hosted the Southern Miss Golden Eagles at Robertson Stadium. It was the first time that Rice Stadium hosted the Championship game series after Rice became the winner of the West Division.

== Teams ==
=== West Division Champions ===
Rice came into the championship with a non–conference record of 2–2 after losing to Texas A&M and former C-USA member Houston and beating Kansas and New Mexico State. Rice was second in the West Division behind Tulane until Rice lost to North Texas, falling into third place. Tulane lost their two conference games in November, which moved Rice back up to second behind North Texas, until North Texas lost to UTSA. Rice then became ranked first in the division. At the end of the regular 2013 season, Rice had to defeat Tulane in order to be crowned the winners of the West Division, or Tulane or UTSA would have been crowned winners of the division. Rice defeated Tulane 17–13 to win the division.

This was Rice's first appearance in Conference USA Championship series.

=== East Division Champions ===
Marshall came into the championship with a non–conference record of 2–2 after losing to Ohio and Virginia Tech and beating Miami(OH) and Gardner–Webb. Marshall was behind East Carolina in second in the East Division standings until East Carolina lost to Tulane, moving Marshall up to first in the standings. Marshall then lost a close game to Middle Tennessee 49–51, which dropped Marshall behind East Carolina for the rest of the season until the East Carolina–Marshall game in late November. In order for Marshall to be crowned the winners of the East Division, Marshall. Marshall beat East Carolina 59–28 to win the East Division.

This was Marshall's first appearance in the Conference USA Championship series.

== Scoring summary ==
Quarter	Time	Drive		Team	Scoring Information	Score	
Quarter	Time	Length	Time	Team	Scoring Information	Marshall	Rice
1	10:15	10 plays, 82 yards	4:45	Rice	Donte Moore 35-yard reception from Luke Turner, Chris Boswell kick good	0	7
1	8:05	2 plays, 73 yards	0:46	Rice	Jordan Taylor 75-yard reception from Taylor McHargue, Chris Boswell kick good	0	14
2	12:21	12 plays, 64 yards	3:39	Marshall	Justin Haig 27-yard kick good	3	14
2	11:29	4 plays, 62 yards	0:52	Rice	Charles Ross 4-yard rush, Chris Boswell kick good	3	21
2	9:18	8 plays, 65 yards	2:11	Marshall	Devon Johnson 1-yard rush, Justin Haig kick good	10	21
3	5:34	7 plays, 61 yards	3:57	Rice	Darik Dillard 17-yard rush, Chris Boswell kick failed	10	27
3	0:24	7 plays, 70 yards	3:33	Rice	Connor Cella 8-yard reception from Luke Turner, Chris Boswell kick good	10	34
4	11:02	12 plays, 78 yards	4:22	Marshall	Essray Taliaferro 7-yard reception from Rakeem Cato, Justin Haig kick good	17	34
4	8:09	2 plays, 38 yards	0:50	Rice	Charles Ross 16-yard rush, Chris Boswell kick good	17	41
4	5:35	8 plays, 75 yards	2:34	Marshall	Devon Smith 3-yard reception from Rakeem Cato, Justin Haig kick good	24	41
Final Score						24	41

=== Statistics ===
Statistics	Marshall	Rice
First downs	23	23
Total offense, plays – yards	78–371	66–487
Rushes-yards (net)	37–106	48–248
Passing yards (net)	265	239
Passes, Comp-Att-Int	10–18–1	24–41–0
Time of Possession	27:40	32:20
