= Reggie Davis (wide receiver) =

American football player (born 1995)

Profile
- Position: Wide receiver

Personal information
- Born: November 22, 1995 (age 30); Tallahassee, Florida
- Listed height: 5 ft 11 in (1.80 m)
- Listed weight: 185 lb (84 kg)

Career information
- High school: Lincoln (Tallahassee, Florida)
- College: Georgia
- NFL draft: 2017: undrafted

Career history
- Atlanta Falcons (2017)*; Cleveland Browns (2017); Atlanta Falcons (2017–2018)*; Philadelphia Eagles (2018)*; Dallas Cowboys (2018–2019)*; Chicago Bears (2019–2021)*; Dallas Cowboys (2021)*; New Orleans Breakers (2023)*
- * Offseason or practice squad member only
- Stats at Pro Football Reference

Reggie Davis (born November 22, 1995) is an American football wide receiver who is currently a free agent. He played college football at Georgia. He signed with the Atlanta Falcons as an undrafted free agent in 2017. He was also a member of the Cleveland Browns, Philadelphia Eagles, Dallas Cowboys, and Chicago Bears.

== Professional career ==
Pre-draft measurables
Height	Weight	Arm length	Hand span	Wingspan	40-yard dash	10-yard split	20-yard split	20-yard shuttle	Three-cone drill	Vertical jump	Broad jump	Bench press
5 ft 11 5/8 in (1.82 m)	158 lb (72 kg)	31 3/4 in (0.81 m)	9 1/4 in (0.23 m)	6 ft 2 1/2 in (1.89 m)	4.36 s	1.52 s	2.62 s	4.12 s	6.94 s	32.0 in (0.81 m)	9 ft 7 in (2.92 m)	4 reps
All values from Pro Day

=== Atlanta Falcons ===
Davis signed with the Atlanta Falcons as an undrafted free agent on May 14, 2017. He was waived by the team on September 2, 2017.

=== Cleveland Browns ===
On September 3, 2017, Davis was claimed off waivers by the Cleveland Browns. He was waived by the Browns on September 22, 2017.

=== Atlanta Falcons (second stint) ===
On September 26, 2017, Davis was signed to the Falcons' practice squad. He signed a reserve/future contract with the Falcons on January 15, 2018.

On September 1, 2018, Davis was waived by the Falcons.

=== Philadelphia Eagles ===
On September 10, 2018, Davis was signed to the Philadelphia Eagles' practice squad. He was released on September 20.

=== Dallas Cowboys ===
On November 1, 2018, Davis was signed to the Dallas Cowboys practice squad. He was re-signed on February 7, 2019. He was released on August 31, 2019.

=== Chicago Bears ===
On December 11, 2019, Davis joined the Chicago Bears' practice squad. He had worked out with the team in September 2018 after receiver Anthony Miller suffered an injury, but was not signed. On December 30, 2019, Davis was signed to a reserve/future contract.

Davis was waived by the team on September 5, 2020, as part of final roster cuts, and re-signed to the practice squad a day later. He was placed on the practice squad/injured list on December 23, 2020. On January 15, 2021, Davis signed a reserve/futures contract with the Bears. He was waived on May 17, 2021.

=== Dallas Cowboys (second stint) ===
On June 11, 2021, Davis signed with the Dallas Cowboys. He was waived on August 31, 2021.

=== New Orleans Breakers ===
Davis signed with the New Orleans Breakers of the USFL on January 14, 2023. On March 27, 2023, Davis was released by the Breakers.
