= 2014 Heart of Dallas Bowl (January) =

- presented by PlainsCapital Bank
UNLV Rebels	North Texas Mean Green
(7–5)	(8–4)
Mountain West	C-USA
14	36
Head coach: Bobby Hauck	Head coach: Dan McCarney
	1	2	3	4	Total
UNLV	7	0	0	7	14
North Texas	7	0	7	22	36
- Date: January 1, 2014
- Season: 2013
- Stadium: Cotton Bowl
- Location: Fair Park; Dallas, Texas
- MVP: Derek Thompson (QB, North Texas)
- Favorite: N. Texas by 6½
- Referee: Ron Snodgrass (MAC)
- Attendance: 38,380
- Payout: US$1.1 million

United States TV coverage
- Network: ESPNU & Nevada Sports Network
- Announcers: Clay Matvick (play-by-play), Matt Stinchcomb (analyst), and Dawn Davenport (sidelines)- ESPNU; Brian Estridge (play-by-play), John Denton, Rob Best (analysts), and Landry Burdine (sidelines)- RedVoice LLC

The 2014 January Heart of Dallas Bowl was an American college football bowl game that was played on January 1, 2014, at the Cotton Bowl at Fair Park in Dallas, Texas. The fourth edition of the Heart of Dallas Bowl, it featured the UNLV Rebels of the Mountain West Conference against the North Texas Mean Green of Conference USA. The game began at 11:00 a.m. CST and aired on ESPNU. It was one of the 2013–14 bowl games that concluded the 2013 FBS football season. The game was sponsored by PlainsCapital Bank and was officially known as the Heart of Dallas Bowl Presented by PlainsCapital Bank.

North Texas defeated UNLV by a score of 36–14. It was their first bowl win since 2002.

UNLV finished the regular season with a record of 7–5 (5–3 MWC), tied for third place in the Mountain West Conference West Division. North Texas had a record of 8–4 (6–2 C-USA) and were tied for second place in the Conference USA West Division. This was the fifth all-time meeting between the two teams, and the first victory of the series for North Texas.

== UNLV Rebels ==
In a year that saw UNLV achieve its first winning season since the turn of the millennium and the return of the Fremont Cannon to Las Vegas, the Rebels accepted an invitation to the Heart of Dallas Bowl after finishing 7–5 overall and 5–3 in Mountain West Conference Play. It was their first bowl eligible season since 2000 when they played in the Las Vegas Bowl, defeating the Arkansas Razorbacks, 31–14. It is also the first time in nearly 30 years that the Rebels played in an away bowl game. The Rebels, who are 3–0 in bowl games, had won all four previous meetings with the Mean Green.

== North Texas Mean Green ==
The Mean Green's first season as a member of Conference USA was also their best in several years, seeing the team finishing 8–4 overall and 6–2 in conference play (tied with the UTSA Roadrunners for second in the C-USA West Division). At season's end, bowl director Brant Ringler extended an invitation to the Mean Green, located only 40 miles to the northwest in Denton, to play in the game.

In addition to being North Texas' first Heart of Dallas Bowl, this was their first bowl game since the 2004 New Orleans Bowl saw them lose to the Southern Miss Golden Eagles by a score of 31–10. It was also their first New Year's Day bowl game since the 1948 Salad Bowl (when they were known as North Texas State Teachers College) saw them lose to the Nevada Wolf Pack by a score of 13–6.

== Game summary ==
=== Scoring summary ===
Scoring summary

Quarter	Time	Drive			Team	Scoring information	Score	
Quarter	Time	Plays	Yards	TOP	Team	Scoring information	UNLV	North Texas
1	7:31	8	95	3:00	UNLV	Marcus Sullivan 9-yard touchdown reception from Caleb Herring, Nolan Kohorst kick good	7	0
1	1:47	8	42	3:55	North Texas	Antoinne Jimmerson 1-yard touchdown run, Zach Paul kick good	7	7
3	6:07	12	60	5:11	North Texas	Drew Miller 7-yard touchdown reception from Derek Thompson, Zach Paul kick good	7	14
4	14:56	12	74	4:44	North Texas	Brelan Chancellor 3-yard touchdown run, Zach Paul kick good	7	21
4	6:59	10	75	5:31	North Texas	Darnell Smith 34-yard touchdown reception from Derek Thompson, Zach Paul kick good	7	28
4	4:56	7	50	1:54	UNLV	Jerry Rice Jr. 13-yard touchdown reception from Caleb Herring, Nolan Kohorst kick good	14	28
4	2:24	3	16	1:39	North Texas	Brelan Chancellor 15-yard touchdown run, 2-point run blocked PAT taken in by Drew Miller	14	36
"TOP" = time of possession. For other American football terms, see Glossary of American football.							14	36

=== Statistics ===
Statistics	UNLV	North Texas
First downs	19	21
Total offense, plays – yards	68–262	75–397
Rushes-yards (net)	66	141
Passing yards (net)	196	256
Passes, Comp-Att-Int	22–41–1	21–30–0
Time of Possession	24:44	35:16
