= Nick Montana =

American football player (born 1992)

No. 5, 11
- Position: Quarterback

Personal information
- Born: April 28, 1992 (age 34); San Francisco, California, U.S.
- Listed height: 6 ft 3 in (1.91 m)
- Listed weight: 207 lb (94 kg)

Career information
- High school: Oaks Christian School (Westlake Village, California)
- College: Washington (2010–2011); Mt. San Antonio (2012); Tulane (2013–2014)
- NFL draft: 2015: undrafted

Nicholas Alexander Montana (born April 28, 1992) is an American former football quarterback.He began his college football career at the University of Washington before transferring to Mt. San Antonio College. After one season at the junior college level, he transferred to Tulane University and played two seasons for the Tulane Green Wave.

== Early life ==
Montana was born in San Francisco. He attended De La Salle High School before transferring to Oaks Christian School prior to his junior year. Among his teammates at Oaks Christian were Trey Smith, son of Will Smith, and Trevor Gretzky, the son of Wayne Gretzky. As a senior, he threw for 2,636 yards and 34 touchdowns.

== Career ==
Montana committed to the University of Washington in 2009. As a true freshman in 2010 he was redshirted. In 2011, he completed 24 of 42 passes for 226 yards with three touchdowns and two interceptions. He made one start completing 11 of 21 passes for 79 yards with two touchdowns and an interception. Prior the 2012 season he transferred to Mt. San Antonio College. He was the team's starting quarterback, completing 203 of 321 passes for 2,652 yards with 22 touchdowns and 11 interceptions. In 2013, he transferred to Tulane University. Prior to the season, he was named the team's starting quarterback.

== Personal life ==
Montana is the son of Hall of Fame NFL quarterback Joe Montana. His brother, Nate Montana, played quarterback at Notre Dame, among other schools.
