= Spectrum Sports (Texas) =

- Country: United States
- Broadcast area: Austin, Beaumont/Port Arthur, Corpus Christi, Dallas–Fort Worth, El Paso, Harlingen, Killeen/Temple, Laredo, Rio Grande Valley, San Antonio, Waco, and Wichita Falls
- Network: Spectrum Sports
- Headquarters: Austin, Texas

Ownership
- Owner: Time Warner Cable (2010-2016); Charter Communications (2016-present)

History
- Launched: 2010
- Closed: June 2017
- Former names: Texas Channel (2010–2012); Time Warner Cable SportsChannel Texas (2012–2016)

Links
- Website: North Texas; Central, South & West Texas

Spectrum Sports was a regional sports network serving Texas and owned by Charter Communications through its acquisition of Time Warner Cable in May 2016. It ceased operations in June 2017, with some of its remaining programs migrating to Spectrum News Austin.

== Programming ==
The following sporting were carried by Spectrum Sports (Texas):

- TAPPS high school games weekly (football, soccer, basketball, volleyball, baseball, softball; Fridays live)
- UIL football (Thursdays live, Friday & Saturday tape delayed, post-season live)
- UTRGV basketball and baseball
- Dallas Sidekicks indoor soccer
- UTSA Roadrunners basketball (select)
- SMU Mustangs basketball (select)
- Southland Conference basketball (Lamar, Incarnate Word, Texas A&M–Corpus Christi, etc.) (select)
- Dr. Pepper Dallas Cup
- Texas State Bobcats football, basketball, and baseball
- Allen Americans hockey

Other shows that aired on Spectrum Sports:

- Raceline
- Future Phenoms
- Sled Head
- Torc Unleased
- Xtream Racing
- FC Dallas MLS soccer (simulcast of TXA 21 outside of Dallas–Fort Worth, primary broadcaster for select games)
- Dallas Vigilantes arena football
