= Cole (given name) =

- Pronunciation: /koʊl/
- Gender: Male

Origin
- Origin: Cole (surname)
- Meaning: "swarthy, coal-black, charcoal"
- Region of origin: England

Cole /koʊl/ is a given name of English origin, originally used as an English surname. It is of Middle English origin, and its meaning is "swarthy, coal-black, charcoal".

It is also an Americanized spelling of the German name Kohl, the Dutch name Kool, and the Scottish and Irish name McCool.

== People ==
=== A ===
- Cole Abate (born 2004), Brazilian martial artist
- Cole Aldrich (born 1988), American basketball player
- Cole Alexander (born 1989), South African footballer
- Cole Anderson (born 1997), American stock car racing driver
- Cole Anderson-James (born 1997), English internet personality
- Cole Anthony (born 2000), American basketball player
- Cole Armstrong (born 1983), Canadian baseball player

=== B ===
- Cole Bardreau (born 1993), American ice hockey player
- Cole Bartiromo (born 1985), American blogger and convicted criminal
- Cole Bassett (born 2001), American soccer player
- Cole Beasley (born 1989), American football player
- Cole Beaudoin (born 2006), Canadian ice hockey player
- Cole Beck (born 1999), American track athlete
- Cole Bennett (born 1996), American videographer
- Cole Bennett (born 2009) Professional FaceTime user and whospie dasies
- Cole Bergquist (born 1985), American football player
- Cole Birkeland, American politician
- Cole Bishop (born 2002), American football player
- Cole Brauer (born 1994), American sailor
- Cole Brevard (born 2001), American football player
- Cole Briggs (born 1997), New Zealand cricketer
- Cole Byers (born 1983), Canadian ice hockey player

=== C ===
- Cole Cabana (born 2004), American football player
- Cole Campbell (born 2006), Icelandic footballer
- Cole Carrigg (born 2002), American baseball player
- Cole Cassels (born 1995), Canadian-American ice hockey player
- Cole Caufield (born 2001), American ice hockey player
- Cole Christensen, American politician
- Cole Christiansen (born 1997), American football player
- Cole Conley (born 1950), American politician
- Cole Croston (born 1993), American football player
- Cole Cubelic, American sports analyst
- Cole Custer (born 1998), American race car driver

=== D ===
- Cole Dasilva (born 1999), English footballer
- Cole Davies (born 2007), New Zealand motocross racer
- Cole Deeming (born 2007), English footballer
- Cole De Vries (born 1985), American baseball player
- Cole Dewhurst (born 2003), American soccer player
- Cole Dickerson (born 1991), American basketball player
- Cole Digges (disambiguation), multiple people
- Cole Durham (born 1948), American educator

=== E ===
- Cole Eiserman (born 2006), American ice hockey player
- Cole Elshere (born 1989), American rodeo cowboy
- Cole Escola (born 1986), American comedian and actor
- Cole Escovedo (born 1981), American mixed martial artist

=== F ===
- Cole Finegan, American lawyer
- Cole Forbes (born 1999), New Zealand rugby union player
- Cole Ford (born 1972), American football player
- Cole Fotheringham (born 1997), American football player
- Cole Frame (born 2002), American soccer player

=== G ===
- Cole Gardner (born 1993), American football player
- Cole Garner (born 1984), American baseball player
- Cole Gillespie (born 1984), American baseball player
- Cole Glasson (born 2000), American stock car racing driver
- Cole Green (baseball) (born 1989), American baseball player
- Cole Gromley (born 1999), American tennis player
- Cole Grossman (born 1989), American soccer player
- Cole Guttman (born 1999), American ice hockey player

=== H ===
- Cole Hamels (born 1983), American baseball player
- Cole Hammer (born 1999), American golfer
- Cole Harden (born 2009), Irish racehorse
- Cole Harris (1936–2022), Canadian geographer
- Cole Hauser (born 1975), American actor
- Cole Hawkins (born 1991), American actor
- Cole Hedlund (born 1995), American football player
- Cole Hefner (born 1980), American politician
- Cole Heppell (born 1993), Canadian actor
- Cole Hikutini (born 1994), American football player
- Cole Hocker (born 2001), American runner
- Cole Holcomb (born 1996), American football player
- Cole House (cyclist) (born 1988), American cyclist
- Cole Houshmand (born 2000), American surfer
- Cole Howard (voice actor) (born 1989), Canadian voice actor
- Cole Hults (born 1998), American ice hockey player
- Cole Hunt (born 1994), American football player
- Cole Hutson (born 2006), American ice hockey player
- Cole Hutson (American football) (born 2004), American football player

=== I ===
- Cole Irvin (born 1994), American baseball player

=== J ===
- Cole Jarrett (born 1983), Canadian ice hockey player
- Cole Jensen (born 2001), American soccer player
- Cole Jester, American politician

=== K ===
- Cole C. Kingseed (born 1949), American historian
- Cole Karter (born 2000), American professional wrestler
- Cole Kehler (born 1997), Canadian ice hockey player
- Cole Keith (born 1997), Canadian rugby union footballer
- Cole Kelley (born 1997), American football player
- Cole Kimball (born 1985), American baseball player
- Cole Kmet (born 1999), American football player
- Cole Koepke (born 1998), American ice hockey player
- Cole Konrad (born 1984), American mixed martial artist
- Cole Kpekawa (born 1996), English footballer
- Cole Krueger (born 1991), Hungarian speed skater

=== L ===
- Cole Liniak (born 1976), American baseball player
- Cole Luke (born 1995), American football player

=== M ===
- Cole Madison (born 1994), American football player
- Cole Magner (born 1982), American football player
- Cole Mazza (born 1995), American football player
- Cole McConchie (born 1992), New Zealand cricketer
- Cole McDonald (born 1998), American football player
- Cole McDonald (skier) (born 2003), American skier
- Cole McKinney (born 2007), American ice hockey player
- Cole McKinnon (born 2003), Scottish footballer
- Cole McNary (born 1964), American politician
- Cole McWard (born 2001), American ice hockey player
- Cole Miller (activist) (born 1956), American activist
- Cole Miller (born 1984), American mixed martial artist
- Cole Missimo (born 1993), American soccer player
- Cole Moore (born 1997), American racing driver
- Cole Mrowka (born 2006), American soccer player
- Cole Murphy (born 1996), American football player

=== N ===
- Cole Nelson (born 1997), Canadian American football player

=== O ===
- Cole O'Hara (born 2002), Canadian ice hockey player
- Cole Oakley (born 2000), British rugby league footballer

=== P ===
- Cole Palen (1925–1993), American aircraft enthusiast
- Cole Palmer (born 2002), English footballer
- Cole Pauls, American author
- Cole Payton (born 2002), American football player
- Cole Pearn (born 1982), Canadian stock car racing driver
- Cole Pennington, American football player
- Cole Perfetti (born 2002), Canadian ice hockey player
- Cole Peverley (born 1988), New Zealand footballer
- Cole Plante (born 1996), American disc jockey
- Cole Popovich (born 1985), American football coach
- Cole Porter (1891–1964), American songwriter
- Cole Powell (born 1992), Canadian stock car racing driver
- Cole Pratt (born 2002), Canadian swimmer
- Cole Proctor, American football coach

=== R ===
- Cole Radrick (born 1997), American professional wrestler
- Cole Ragans (born 1997), American baseball player
- Cole Reschny (born 2007), Canadian ice hockey player
- Cole Reinhardt (born 2000), Canadian ice hockey player
- Cole Riel (born 1995), American politician
- Cole Rouse (born 1997), American race car driver

=== S ===
- Cole Sanchez (born 1985), American artist
- Cole Sand (born 2003), American actor
- Cole Sands (born 1997), American baseball player
- Cole Sax, American film director
- Cole Schneider (born 1990), American ice hockey player
- Cole Schneider (American football) (born 1998), American football player
- Cole Schwindt (born 2001), Canadian ice hockey player
- Cole Seely (born 1990), American motocross racer
- Cole Seiler (born 1994), American soccer player
- Cole Shade Sule (born 1980), Cameroonian swimmer
- Cole Sillinger (born 2003), Canadian ice hockey player
- Cole Skuse (born 1986), English footballer
- Cole Smith (disambiguation), multiple people
- Cole Snyder (born 2000), American football player
- Cole Spieker (born 1996), American football player
- Cole Sprouse (born 1992), American actor
- Cole Sternberg (born 1979), American visual artist
- Cole Stockton (born 1994), English footballer
- Cole Stoudt (born 1992), American football player and coach
- Cole Strange (born 1998), American football player
- Cole Stratton (born 1976), American actor
- Cole Sullivan (born 2005), American football player
- Cole Sulser (born 1990), American baseball player
- Cole Swensen (born 1955), American poet
- Cole Swider (born 1999), American basketball player
- Cole Swindell (born 1983), American singer

=== T ===
- Cole Taylor (died 1989), American pornographic actor
- Cole Tinkler (born 1986), New Zealand footballer
- Cole Toner (born 1994), American football player
- Cole Tracy (born 1996), American football player
- Cole Trapnell (born 1982), American professor
- Cole Tucker (disambiguation), multiple people
- Cole Turner (disambiguation), multiple people

=== U ===
- Cole Ully (born 1995), Canadian ice hockey player

=== V ===
- Cole Van Lanen (born 1998), American football player
- Cole Vosbury (born 1991), American singer-songwriter

=== W ===
- Cole Walliser (born 1981), Canadian film director
- Cole Walsh (born 1995), American pole vaulter
- Cole Wehrle (born 1986), American game designer
- Cole Weston (1919–2003), American photographer
- Cole White (born 1985), American baseball player
- Cole Whitt (born 1991), American race car driver
- Cole Wick (born 1993), American football player
- Cole Wilcox (born 1999), American baseball player
- Cole Willging (1911–1973), American football player
- Cole Williams (born 1981), American actor
- Cole Williams (racing driver) (born 1996), American stock car racing driver
- Cole Wilson (1922–1993), New Zealand singer-songwriter
- Cole Winn (born 1999), American baseball player
- Cole Wisniewski (born 2002), American football player
- Cole Wist (born 1962), American attorney and politician

=== Y ===
- Cole Young (born 2003), American baseball player
- Cole Younger (1844–1916), American outlaw

== Fictional characters ==
- Coel Hen, also known as King Cole, a figure in British literature and legend, possibly the basis for the nursery rhyme Old King Cole
- Cole (Ninjago), a character in Ninjago, a Lego theme
- Cole Deschanel, in the soap opera Sunset Beach
- Cole Evans, in the television series Power Rangers Wild Force
- Cole Hartford Gioberti, in the soap opera Falcon Crest
- Cole Howard, in the soap opera The Young and the Restless
- Cole MacGrath (Infamous), Sony Character of Protagonist a video game character
- Cole Phelps, video game character in L.A. Noire
- Cole Thornhart, in the soap operas One Life to Live and General Hospital
- Cole Trickle, in the film Days of Thunder
- Cole Turner (Charmed), in the television series Charmed

== See also ==
- Coe (surname)
- Cole (disambiguation)
- Cole (surname)
- Coles (surname)
- Kole (name)
