= 2013 Army Black Knights football team =

American college football season

2013 Army Black Knights football
- Conference: Independent
- Record: 3–9
- Head coach: Rich Ellerson (5th season)
- Offensive coordinator: Ian Shields (5th season)
- Offensive scheme: Triple option
- Co-defensive coordinators: Payam Saadat (5th season); Chris Smeland (5th season)
- Base defense: Double Eagle Flex
- Captains: Thomas Holloway; Michael Kime; Jarrett Mackey
- Home stadium: Michie Stadium

2013 NCAA Division I FBS independents football records
	Conf.			Overall
Team	W		L	W		L
No. 20 Notre Dame*		–		9	–	4
Navy		–		9	–	4
BYU		–		8	–	5
Army		–		3	–	9
New Mexico State		–		2	–	10
Idaho		–		1	–	11
*All wins for Notre Dame (9–4) in the 2013 season were later vacated; Rankings from AP Poll

The 2013 Army Black Knights football team represented the United States Military Academy as an independent in the 2013 NCAA Division I FBS football season. The Black Knights were led by fifth-year head coach Rich Ellerson and played their home games at Michie Stadium. Following the loss to Navy on December 14 and finishing the season 3–9, Ellerson was fired.

== Schedule ==
Date	Time	Opponent	Site	TV	Result	Attendance
August 30	7:00 p.m.	Morgan State	Michie Stadium; West Point, NY	CBSSN	W 28–12	24,245
September 7	1:00 p.m.	at Ball State	Scheumann Stadium; Muncie, IN	ESPN3	L 14–40	15,106
September 14	12:00 p.m.	No. 5 Stanford	Michie Stadium; West Point, NY	CBSSN	L 20–34	39,644
September 21	12:00 p.m.	Wake Forest	Michie Stadium; West Point, NY	CBSSN	L 11–25	33,610
September 28	4:00 p.m.	vs. Louisiana Tech	Cotton Bowl; Dallas, TX (Heart of Dallas Classic)	FS1	W 35–16	31,278
October 5	1:00 p.m.	at Boston College	Alumni Stadium; Chestnut Hill, MA	ESPN3	L 27–48	33,128
October 12	12:00 p.m.	Eastern Michigan	Michie Stadium; West Point, NY	CBSSN	W 50–25	36,006
October 19	1:00 p.m.	at Temple	Lincoln Financial Field; Philadelphia, PA	ESPN3	L 14–33	25,533
November 2	12:00 p.m.	at Air Force	Falcon Stadium; Colorado Springs, CO (Commander-in-Chief's Trophy)	ESPNU	L 28–42	36,512
November 9	12:00 p.m.	Western Kentucky	Michie Stadium; West Point, NY	CBSSN	L 17–21	36,276
November 30	11:00 p.m.	at Hawaii	Aloha Stadium; Honolulu, HI	OTW PPV	L 42–49	32,690
December 14	3:00 p.m.	vs. Navy	Lincoln Financial Field; Philadelphia, PA (Army–Navy Game, Commander-in-Chief's Trophy)	CBS	L 7–34	65,612
Rankings from AP Poll released prior to the game; All times are in Eastern time

== Game summaries ==
=== Morgan State ===
Morgan State Bears at Army Black Knights

Quarter	1	2	3	4	Total
Bears	0	6	6	0	12
Black Knights	14	7	7	0	28

at Michie Stadium, West Point, New York

- Date: August 30, 2013
- Game time: 7:00 p.m. EDT
- Game weather: Temperature: – F • Wind: – • Weather: –
- Game attendance: 24,245
- Referee: Gary Patterson
- TV announcers (CBSSN): Ben Holden (Play-by-play), Tom Bradley (color) & Kristine Leahy (sideline)
- ESPN – Santiago shines as Army beats Morgan State 28–12 /// Box Score, Morgan State at Army

Game information

First Quarter

- (06:17) ARMY TD: Angel Santiago 33-yard rush (Daniel Grochowski kick); 8 plays, 95 yards, 3:07
- (00:36) ARMY TD: Angel Santiago 1-yard rush (Daniel Grochowski kick); 7 plays, 88 yards, 3:11

Second Quarter

- (12:05) ARMY TD: Chevaughn Lawrence 18-yard pass from Angel Santiago (Daniel Grochowski kick); 2 plays, 23 yards, 0:47
- (02:50) MSU TD: Robert Council 1-yard rush (TEAM rush failed); 18 plays, 82 yards, 9:05

Third Quarter

- (12:36) ARMY TD: Angel Santiago 3-yard rush (Daniel Grochowski kick); 5 plays, 65 yards, 2:14
- (08:09) MSU TD: Chris Flowers 22-yard pass from Robert Council (Chris Moller kick failed); 9 plays, 81 yards, 4:17

Fourth Quarter

no scoring

Passing

- MSU – Robert Council: 4/7, 89 yds, 1 TD
- ARMY – Angel Santiago: 4/8, 101 yds, 1 TD

Rushing

- MSU – Lamont Brown: 19 att, 75 yds
- ARMY – Angel Santiago: 16 att, 120 yds, 3 TD

Receiving

- MSU – Tubotein Taylor: 1 rec, 41 yds
- ARMY – Xavier Moss: 2 rec, 75 yds

=== At Ball State ===
Army Black Knights at Ball State Cardinals

Quarter	1	2	3	4	Total
Black Knights	7	0	7	0	14
Cardinals	14	13	10	3	40

at Scheumann Stadium, Muncie, Indiana

- Date: September 7, 2013
- Game time: 1:00 p.m. EDT
- Game weather: Temperature: 82 F • Wind: WSW 11 mph • Weather: Partly cloudy
- Game attendance: 15,106
- Referee: Don Willard
- TV announcers (ESPN3): Trey Bender (Play-by-play) & Mark Herrmann (color)
- ESPN – Wenning, Ball St. passing too much for Army 40–14 /// Box Score, Army at Ball State

Game information

First Quarter

- (14:04) ARMY TD: Larry Dixon 71-yard rush (Daniel Grochowski kick); 3 plays, 75 yards, 0:56
- (10:45) BSU TD: Horactio Banks 10-yard rush (Scott Secor kick); 9 plays, 60 yards, 3:17
- (04:29) BSU TD: Jamill Smith 8-yard pass from Keith Wenning (Scott Secor kick); 10 plays, 76 yards, 4:26

Second Quarter

- (12:57) BSU FG: Scott Secor 47-yard field goal; 10 plays, 54 yards, 3:03
- (10:40) BSU FG: Scott Secor 34-yard field goal; 4 plays, 4 yards, 1:24
- (01:01) BSU TD: Horactio Banks 6-yard rush (Scott Secor kick); 5 plays, 80 yards, 1:20

Third Quarter

- (10:46) BSU FG: Scott Secor 19-yard field goal; 10 plays, 52 yards, 4:11
- (10:35) BSU TD: Zane Fakes 11-yard pass from Keith Wenning (Scott Secor kick); 1 play, 11 yards, 0:06
- (01:40) ARMY TD: Larry Dixon 9-yard rush (Daniel Grochowski kick); 13 plays, 56 yards, 4:53

Fourth Quarter

- (12:21) BSU FG: Scott Secor 20-yard field goal; 10 plays, 72 yards, 4:19

Passing

- ARMY – Angel Santiago: 3/11, 49 yds, 1 INT
- BSU – Keith Wenning: 23/32, 325 yds, 2 TD

Rushing

- ARMY – Larry Dixon: 13 att, 113 yds, 2 TD
- BSU – Teddy Williamson: 13 att, 58 yds

Receiving

- ARMY – Anthony Stephens: 3 rec, 21 yds
- BSU – Jamill Smith: 5 rec, 83 yds, 1 TD

=== Stanford ===
#5 Stanford Cardinal at Army Black Knights

Quarter	1	2	3	4	Total
No. 5 Cardinal	7	13	7	7	34
Black Knights	6	7	0	7	20

at Michie Stadium, West Point, New York

- Date: September 14, 2013
- Game time: 12:00 p.m. EDT
- Game attendance: 39,644
- TV announcers (CBSSN): Ben Holden (Play-by-play), Tom Bradley (color) & Kristine Leahy (sideline)
- ESPN – No. 5 Stanford puts away Army in 2nd half

Game information

First Quarter

- (11:47) ARMY FG: Daniel Grochowski 39-yard field goal; 4 plays, 8 yards, 2:01
- (03:27) ARMY FG: Daniel Grochowski 48-yard field goal; 12 plays, 38 yards, 6:11
- (00:32) STAN TD: Michael Rector 26-yard pass from Kevin Hogan (Jordan Williamson kick); 6 plays, 75 yards, 2:55

Second Quarter

- (12:13) STAN TD: Ty Montgomery 46-yard pass from Kevin Hogan (Jordan Williamson kick); 1 play, 46 yards, 0:09
- (03:53) STAN FG: Jordan Williamson 31-yard field goal; 9 plays, 51 yards, 3:34
- (01:09) ARMY TD: Larry Dixon 15-yard rush (Daniel Grochowski kick); 7 plays, 75 yards, 2:44
- (00:00) STAN FG: Jordan Williamson 47-yard field goal; 6 plays, 39 yards, 1:09

Third Quarter

- (04:05) STAN TD: Tyler Gaffney 23-yard pass from Kevin Hogan (Jordan Williamson kick); 8 plays, 56 yards, 3:31

Fourth Quarter

- (09:59) STAN TD: Tyler Gaffney 1-yard rush (Jordan Williamson kick); 5 plays, 28 yards, 2:50
- (00:17) ARMY TD: Edgar Allen Poe 6-yard pass from A.J. Schurr (Daniel Grochowski kick); 11 plays, 58 yards, 3:06

Passing

- STAN – Kevin Hogan: 11/18, 188 yds, 3 TD, 1 INT
- ARMY – A.J. Schurr: 4/5, 25 yds, 1 TD

Rushing

- STAN – Tyler Gaffney: 20 att, 132 yds, 1 TD
- ARMY – Terry Baggett: 9 att, 96 yds

Receiving

- STAN – Ty Montgomery: 6 rec, 130 yds, 1 TD
- ARMY – Terry Baggett: 1 rec, 16 yds

=== Wake Forest ===
Wake Forest Demon Deacons at Army Black Knights

Quarter	1	2	3	4	Total
Demon Deacons	0	10	8	7	25
Black Knights	2	3	6	0	11

at Michie Stadium, West Point, New York

- Date: September 21, 2013
- Game time: 12:00 p.m. EDT
- Game attendance: 33,610
- Referee: Dennis Hennigan
- TV announcers (CBSSN): Ben Holden (Play-by-play), Tom Bradley (color) & Kristine Leahy (sideline)
- ESPN – Harris scores twice, Wake Forest beats Army 25–11 /// Box Score, Wake Forest at Army

Game information

First Quarter

- (03:14) ARMY: TEAM Safety Forced on WF

Second Quarter

- (09:39) WF FG: Chad Hedlund 35-yard field goal; 12 plays, 22 yards, 5:52
- (01:28) WF TD: Michael Campanaro 66-yard pass from Tanner Price (Chad Hedlund kick); 2 plays, 77 yards, 0:33
- (00:38) ARMY FG: Daniel Grochowski 39-yard field goal; 5 plays, 53 yards, 0:50

Third Quarter

- (10:05) ARMY FG: Daniel Grochowski 32-yard field goal; 6 plays, 21 yards, 3:09
- (03:44) ARMY FG: Daniel Grochowski 32-yard field goal; 11 plays, 54 yards, 5:18
- (01:42) WF TD: Josh Harris 15-yard rush (J. Williams pass from Tanner Price); 5 plays, 75 yards, 2:02

Fourth Quarter

- (09:01) WF TD: Josh Harris 6-yard rush (Chad Hedlund kick); 9 plays, 62 yards, 4:38

Passing

- WF – Tanner Price: 6/17, 132 yds, 1 TD, 1 INT
- ARMY – Kelvin White: 5/6, 45 yds

Rushing

- WF – Josh Harris: 19 att, 96 yds, 2 TD
- ARMY – Terry Baggett: 16 att, 125 yds

Receiving

- WF – Michael Campanaro: 4 rec, 91 yds, 1 TD
- ARMY – Xavier Moss: 8 rec, 61 yds

=== Vs. Louisiana Tech ===
Army Black Knights vs. Louisiana Tech Bulldogs (Heart of Dallas Classic)

Quarter	1	2	3	4	Total
Black Knights	14	7	7	7	35
Bulldogs	0	9	7	0	16

at Cotton Bowl, Dallas, Texas

- Date: September 28, 2013
- Game time: 3:00 p.m. CDT
- Game attendance: 31,278
- Referee: Clay Martin
- TV announcers (FS1): Justin Kutcher (Play-by-play), James Bates (color) & Brady Poppinga (sideline)
- ESPN – Baggett carries Army past Louisiana Tech 35–16 /// Box Score, Army vs Louisiana Tech

Game information

First Quarter

- (08:08) ARMY TD: Terry Baggett 9-yard rush (Daniel Grochowski kick); 13 plays, 85 yards, 5:04
- (00:03) ARMY TD: Terry Baggett 14-yard rush (Daniel Grochowski kick); 13 plays, 66 yards, 5:48

Second Quarter

- (07:29) LATECH TD: Andrew Guillot 29-yard pass from Ryan Higgins (Kyle Fischer kick failed); 6 plays, 83 yards, 2:38
- (00:59) ARMY TD: Aaron Kemper 3-yard rush (Daniel Grochowski kick); 14 plays, 90 yards, 6:30
- (00:00) LATECH FG: Kyle Fischer 31-yard field goal; 7 plays, 63 yards, 0:59

Third Quarter

- (09:56) ARMY TD: Angel Santiago 1-yard rush (Daniel Grochowski kick); 10 plays, 77 yards, 5:04
- (06:32) LATECH TD: Kenneth Dixon 7-yard rush (Kyle Fischer kick); 8 plays, 85 yards, 3:24

Fourth Quarter

- (08:52) ARMY TD: Kelvin White 1-yard rush (Daniel Grochowski kick); 12 plays, 61 yards, 7:07

Passing

- ARMY – Angel Santiago: 1/3, 16 yds
- LATECH – Ryan Higgins: 20/36, 320 yds, 1 TD, 1 INT

Rushing

- ARMY – Terry Baggett: 18 att, 143 yds, 2 TD
- LATECH – Kenneth Dixon: 16 att, 71 yds, 1 TD

Receiving

- ARMY – Hayden Tippett: 1 rec, 16 yds
- LATECH – Andrew Guillot: 5 rec, 320 yds, 1 TD

=== At Boston College ===
Army Black Knights at Boston College Eagles

Quarter	1	2	3	4	Total
Black Knights	10	10	7	0	27
Eagles	14	17	7	10	48

at Alumni Stadium, Chestnut Hill, Massachusetts

- Date: October 5, 2013
- Game time: 1:00 p.m. EDT
- Game weather: Temperature: 68 F • Wind: NE 5–10 mph • Weather: Partly cloudy
- Game attendance: 33,128
- Referee: Gary Patterson
- TV announcers (ESPN3): Shawn Kenney (Play-by-play) & Peter Najarian (color)
- ESPN – Williams powers BC with 263 yards, 5 TDs /// Box Score, Army at Boston College

Game information

First Quarter

- (09:07) ARMY FG: Daniel Grochowski 38-yard field goal; 13 plays, 60 yards, 5:53
- (06:59) BC TD: David Dudeck 3-yard pass from Chase Rettig (Nate Freese kick); 4 plays, 80 yards, 2:08
- (06:49) ARMY TD: Xavier Moss 80-yard pass from Angel Santiago (Daniel Grochowski kick); 1 play, 80 yards, 0:10
- (05:19) BC TD: Andre Williams 34-yard rush (Nate Freese kick); 4 plays, 58 yards, 1:30

Second Quarter

- (14:40) ARMY TD: Larry Dixon 3-yard rush (Daniel Grochowski kick); 15 plays, 80 yards, 5:39
- (12:08) BC TD: Andre Williams 1-yard rush (Nate Freese kick); 6 plays, 51 yards, 2:32
- (09:00) BC TD: Andre Williams 37-yard rush (Nate Freese kick); 5 plays, 65 yards, 1:14
- (00:48) ARMY FG: Daniel Grochowski 40-yard field goal; 17 plays, 67 yards, 8:12
- (00:00) BC FG: Nate Freese 49-yard field goal; 4 plays, 32 yards, 0:48

Third Quarter

- (12:52) ARMY TD: Larry Dixon 80-yard rush (Daniel Grochowski kick); 1 play, 80 yards, 0:11
- (06:39) BC TD: Andre Williams 3-yard rush (Nate Freese kick); 13 plays, 93 yards, 6:13

Fourth Quarter

- (14:18) BC FG: Nate Freese 28-yard field goal; 9 plays, 68 yards, 4:04
- (12:27) BC TD: Andre Williams 34-yard rush (Nate Freese kick); 2 plays, 38 yards, 0:42

Passing

- ARMY – Angel Santiago: 2/3, 82 yds, 1 TD
- BC – Chase Rettig: 11/13, 203 yds, 1 TD

Rushing

- ARMY – Larry Dixon: 11 att, 125 yds, 2 TD
- BC – Andre Williams: 30 att, 263 yds, 5 TD

Receiving

- ARMY – Xavier Moss: 2 rec, 82 yds, 1 TD
- BC – Alex Amidon: 5 rec, 122 yds

=== Eastern Michigan ===
Eastern Michigan Eagles at Army Black Knights

Quarter	1	2	3	4	Total
Eagles	15	3	0	7	25
Black Knights	15	7	21	7	50

at Michie Stadium, West Point, New York

- Date: October 12, 2013
- Game time: 12:00 p.m. EDT
- Game weather: Temperature: 65 F • Wind: N 11 mph • Weather: Mostly sunny
- Game attendance: 36,006
- Referee: Jeff Heaser
- TV announcers (CBSSN): Ben Holden (Play-by-play), Tom Bradley (color) & Kristine Leahy (sideline)
- ESPN – Baggett carries Army past E. Michigan 50–25 /// Box Score, Eastern Michigan at Army

Game information

First Quarter

- (09:24) EMU TD: Bronson Hill 17-yard pass from Tyler Benz (Cole Gardner pass from Mark Iannotti); 10 plays, 76 yards, 5:36
- (04:55) ARMY TD: Terry Baggett 4-yard rush (Daniel Grochowski kick); 8 plays, 70 yards, 4:22
- (03:55) EMU TD: Bronson Hill 12-yard rush (Dylan Mulder kick); 3 plays, 65 yards, 0:53
- (03:35) ARMY TD: Terry Baggett 67-yard rush (Angel Santiago rush); 1 play, 67 yards, 0:15

Second Quarter

- (09:46) ARMY TD: Trenton Turrentine 1-yard rush (Daniel Grochowski kick); 17 plays, 69 yards, 7:13
- (00:05) EMU FG: Dylan Mulder 31-yard field goal; 17 plays, 73 yards, 6:22

Third Quarter

- (11:08) ARMY TD: Terry Baggett 34-yard rush (Daniel Grochowski kick); 8 plays, 71 yards, 3:52
- (09:05) ARMY TD: Terry Baggett 96-yard rush (Daniel Grochowski kick); 2 plays, 96 yards, 0:25
- (01:40) ARMY TD: Larry Dixon 30-yard rush (Daniel Grochowski kick); 9 plays, 80 yard, 4:41

Fourth Quarter

- (11:47) EMU TD: Dustin Creel 28-yard pass from Tyler Benz (Dylan Mulder kick); 9 plays, 64 yards, 4:45
- (06:18) ARMY TD: Matt Giachinta 4-yard rush (Cale Brewer kick); 9 plays, 64 yards, 5:23

Passing

- EMU – Tyler Benz: 17/26, 223 yds, 2 TD, 1 INT
- ARMY – Angel Santiago 5/7, 38 yds

Rushing

- EMU – Bronson Hill: 20 att, 143 yds, 1 TD
- ARMY – Terry Baggett: 18 att, 304 yds, 4 TD (school record – single game rushing yards)

Receiving

- EMU – Bronson Hill: 4 rec, 91 yds, 1 TD
- ARMY – Xavier Moss: 4 rec, 30 yds

=== At Temple ===
Army Black Knights at Temple Owls

Quarter	1	2	3	4	Total
Black Knights	0	0	7	7	14
Owls	14	12	7	0	33

at Lincoln Financial Field, Philadelphia, Pennsylvania

- Date: October 19, 2013
- Game time: 1:00 p.m. EDT
- Game weather: Temperature: 64 F • Wind: SE 6 mph • Weather: Mostly cloudy
- Game attendance: 25,533
- Referee: Tracey Jones
- TV announcers (ESPN3): John Sadak (Play-by-play), Al Groh (color) & Angela Mallen (sideline)
- ESPN – Temple wins first game of season 33–14 over Army /// Box Score, Army at Temple

Game information

First Quarter

- (12:13) TEMPLE TD: Kenneth Harper 1-yard rush (Nick Visco kick); 6 plays, 78 yards, 2:47
- (04:26) TEMPLE TD: Jalen Fitzpatrick pass from Phillip Walker (Nick Visco kick); 10 plays, 99 yards, 3:34

Second Quarter

- (03:43) TEMPLE TD: John Christopher 39-yard pass from Phillip Walker (Nick Visco kick failed); 3 plays, 37 yards, 1:04
- (03:26) TEMPLE TD: Nate Smith 19-yard fumble recovery (Phillip Walker pass failed)

Third Quarter

- (09:04) TEMPLE TD: Zaire Williams 15-yard rush (Nick Visco kick); 2 plays, 21 yards, 0:46
- (03:19) ARMY TD: Patrick Laird 14-yard pass from Kelvin White (Daniel Grochowski kick); 13 plays, 78 yards, 5:40

Fourth Quarter

- (14:48) ARMY TD: Kelvin White 1-yard rush (Daniel Grochowski kick); 7 plays, 67 yards, 2:11

Passing

- ARMY – Kelvin White: 7/16, 79 yds, 1 TD, 2 INT
- TEMPLE – Phillip Walker: 10/16, 203 yds, 2 TD, 1 INT

Rushing

- ARMY – Larry Dixon: 16 att, 84 yds
- TEMPLE – Zaire Williams: 19 att, 94 yds, 1 TD

Receiving

- ARMY – Xavier Moss: 5 rec, 40 yds
- TEMPLE – Jalen Fitzpatrick: 4 rec, 128 yds, 1 TD

=== At Air Force ===
Army Black Knights at Air Force Falcons

Quarter	1	2	3	4	Total
Black Knights	14	7	0	7	28
Falcons	7	14	7	14	42

at Falcon Stadium, Colorado Springs, Colorado

- Date: November 2, 2013
- Game time: 10:00 a.m. MDT
- Game weather: Temperature: 41 F • Wind: S 5 mph • Weather: Sunny
- Game attendance: 36,512
- Referee: Jeff Flanagan
- TV announcers (ESPNU): Clay Matvick (Play-by-play), Kelly Stouffer (color) & Niki Noto (sideline)
- ESPN – Air Force controls Army to end 7-game skid /// Box Score, Army at Air Force

Game information

First Quarter

- (10:48) ARMY TD: Angel Santiago 4-yard rush (Daniel Grochowski kick); 9 plays, 75 yards, 4:12
- (09:51) AF TD: Anthony LaCoste 73-yard rush (Will Conant kick); 2 plays, 75 yards, 0:57
- (03:23) ARMY TD: Angel Santiago 1-yard rush (Daniel Grochowski kick); 16 plays, 75 yards, 6:28

Second Quarter

- (06:30) AF TD: Garrett Brown 14-yard rush (Will Conant kick); 8 plays, 46 yards, 3:27
- (01:58) ARMY TD: Angel Santiago 1-yard rush (Daniel Grochowski kick); 10 plays, 75 yards, 4:32
- (00:11) AF TD: Nate Romine 1-yard rush (Will Conant kick); 6 plays, 72 yards, 1:41

Third Quarter

- (08:37) AF TD: Anthony LaCoste 78-yard rush (Will Conant kick); 1 play, 78 yards, 0:12

Fourth Quarter

- (14:45) AF TD: Anthony LaCoste 1-yard rush (Will Conant kick); 10 plays, 70 yards, 2:35
- (05:58) ARMY TD: Terry Baggett 10-yard rush (Daniel Grochowski kick); 4 plays, 25 yards, 1:17
- (03:41) AF TD: Broam Hart 3-yard rush (Will Conant kick); 8 plays, 75 yards, 2:17

Passing

- ARMY – Angel Santiago: 8/14, 109 yds
- AF – Nate Romine: 7/8, 111 yds

Rushing

- ARMY – Terry Baggett: 20 att, 121 yds, 1 TD
- AF – Anthony LaCoste: 23 att, 263 yds, 3 TD

Receiving

- ARMY – Xavier Moss: 3 rec, 35 yds
- AF – Garrett Brown: 4 rec, 78 yds

=== WKU ===
Western Kentucky Hilltoppers at Army Black Knights

Quarter	1	2	3	4	Total
Hilltoppers	0	0	7	14	21
Black Knights	0	3	7	7	17

at Michie Stadium, West Point, New York

- Date: November 9, 2013
- Game time: 12:00 p.m. EST
- Game weather: Temperature: 43 F • Wind: SW 5–10 mph • Weather: Mostly cloudy
- Game attendance: 36,276
- Referee: Jeff Heaser
- TV announcers (CBSSN): Ben Holden (Play-by-play), Tom Bradley (color) & Kristine Leahy (sideline)
- ESPN – Western Kentucky edges Army in 21–17 comeback win /// Box Score, Western Kentucky at Army

Game information

First Quarter

no scoring

Second Quarter

- (03:35) ARMY FG: Daniel Grochowski 25-yard field goal; 14 plays, 72 yards, 7:49

Third Quarter

- (10:33) ARMY TD: Angel Santiago 1-yard rush (Daniel Grochowski kick); 11 plays, 77 yards, 4:19
- (05:35) WKU TD: Willie McNeal 11-yard pass from Brandon Doughty (Garrett Schwettman kick); 9 plays, 60 yards, 4:51

Fourth Quarter

- (14:54) WKU TD: Willie McNeal 4-yard pass from Brandon Doughty (Garrett Schwettman kick); 9 plays, 44 yards, 3:59
- (07:03) ARMY TD: Terry Baggett 20-yard rush (Daniel Grochowski kick); 15 plays, 75 yards, 7:45
- (00:32) WKU TD: Antonio Andrews 2-yard rush (Garrett Schwettman kick); 10 plays, 87 yards, 3:44

Passing

- WKU – Brandon Doughty: 16/24, 199 yds, 2 TD, 1 INT
- ARMY – Angel Santiago: 8/11, 70 yds

Rushing

- WKU – Antonio Andrews: 24 att, 117 yds, 1 TD
- ARMY – Terry Baggett: 12 att, 102 yds, 1 TD

Receiving

- WKU – Willie McNeal: 6 rec, 101 yds, 2 TD
- ARMY – Tony Giovannelli: 2 rec, 29 yds

=== At Hawaii ===
Army Black Knights at Hawaii Rainbow Warriors

Quarter	1	2	3	4	Total
Black Knights	0	7	21	14	42
Rainbow Warriors	14	14	14	7	49

at Aloha Stadium, Honolulu, Hawaii

- Date: November 30, 2013
- Game time: 5:00 p.m. HST
- Game weather: Temperature: 78 F • Wind: S 10 mph • Weather: Partly cloudy
- Game attendance: 32,690
- Referee: Alan Eck
- TV announcers (OTW PPV): Robert Kekaula (Play-by-play), Dick Tomey (color) & Lori Santi (sideline)
- ESPN – Hawaii gets 1st win of season, 49–42 over Army /// Box Score, Army at Hawaii

Game information

First Quarter

- (11:45) UH TD: Scott Harding 26-yard pass from Sean Schroeder (Tyler Hadden kick); 5 plays, 54 yards, 1:42
- (07:45) UH TD: Marc Langkilde 1-yard pass from Sean Schroeder (Tyler Hadden kick); 7 plays, 74 yards, 1:51

Second Quarter

- (13:37) ARMY TD: Angel Santiago 6-yard rush (Daniel Grochowski kick); 13 plays, 80 yards, 5:31
- (09:53) UH TD: Vasquez Haynes 10-yard pass from Sean Schroeder (Tyler Hadden kick); 11 plays, 80 yards, 3:40
- (06:03) UH TD: Harold Moleni 1-yard pass from Joey Iosefa (Tyler Hadden kick); 6 plays, 42 yards, 2:17

Third Quarter

- (11:38) ARMY TD: A.J. Schurr 2-yard rush (Daniel Grochowski kick); 5 plays, 47 yards, 1:57
- (10:39) ARMY TD: A.J. Schurr 2-yard rush (Daniel Grochowski kick); 3 plays, 38 yards, 0:59
- (06:17) ARMY TD: A.J. Schurr 1-yard rush (Daniel Grochowski kick); 7 plays, 68 yards, 2:42
- (04:40) UH TD: Joey Iosefa 8-yard rush (Tyler Hadden kick); 5 plays, 80 yards, 1:33
- (01:27) UH TD: Steve Lakalaka 1-yard rush (Tyler Hadden kick); 7 plays, 76 yards, 1:31

Fourth Quarter

- (14:21) ARMY TD: Matt Giachinta 11-yard rush (Daniel Grochowski kick); 6 plays, 75 yards, 2:06
- (09:50) UH TD: Sean Schroeder 6-yard rush (Tyler Hadden kick); 13 plays, 75 yards, 4:31
- (02:30) ARMY TD: A.J. Schurr 2-yard rush (Daniel Grochowski kick); 11 plays, 84 yards, 4:13

Passing

- ARMY – A.J. Schurr: 5/10, 122 yds
- UH – Sean Schroeder: 23/33, 322 yds, 3 TD, 1 INT

Rushing

- ARMY – Terry Baggett: 14 att, 81 yds
- UH – Joey Iosefa: 28 att, 154 yds, 1 TD

Receiving

- ARMY – Xavier Moss: 3 rec, 72 yds
- UH – Chris Gant: 8 rec, 116 yds

=== Vs. Navy ===
Army Black Knights vs. Navy Midshipmen (114th Army-Navy Game)

Quarter	1	2	3	4	Total
Black Knights	0	0	7	0	7
Midshipmen	3	14	3	14	34

at Lincoln Financial Field, Philadelphia, Pennsylvania

- Date: December 14, 2013
- Game time: 3:00 p.m. EST
- Game weather: Temperature: 26 F • Wind: E 9 mph • Weather: Snow
- Game attendance: 65,612
- Referee: John McDaid
- TV announcers (CBS): Verne Lundquist (Play-by-play), Gary Danielson (color) & Tracy Wolfson (sideline)
- ESPN – Reynolds, Navy run to easy win over Army /// Box Score, Army vs Navy (114th Army-Navy Game)

Game information

First Quarter

- (01:22) NAVY FG: Nick Sloan 20-yard field goal; 5 plays, 60 yards, 2:49

Second Quarter

- (08:15) NAVY TD: Noah Copeland 39-yard rush (Nick Sloan kick); 3 plays, 58 yards, 0:45
- (02:38) NAVY TD: Keenan Reynolds 47-yard rush (Nick Sloan kick); 1 play, 47 yards, 0:10

Third Quarter

- (06:36) ARMY TD: Angel Santiago 4-yard rush (Daniel Grochowski kick); 7 plays, 71 yards, 3:03
- (01:04) NAVY FG: Nick Sloan 34-yard field goal; 11 plays, 51 yards, 5:26

Fourth Quarter

- (06:22) NAVY TD: Keenan Reynolds 11-yard rush (Keenan Reynolds pass from Brendan Dudeck); 8 plays, 53 yards, 4:56
- (00:46) NAVY TD: Keenan Reynolds 1-yard rush (Nick Sloan kick failed); 9 plays, 36 yards, 5:15

Passing

- ARMY – Angel Santiago: 5/10, 50 yds, 1 INT
- NAVY – Keenan Reynolds: 2/7, 10 yds

Rushing

- ARMY – Terry Baggett: 11 att, 41 yds
- NAVY – Keenan Reynolds: 30 att, 136 yds, 3 TD

Receiving

- ARMY – Xavier Moss: 5 rec, 50 yds
- NAVY – DeBrandon Sanders: 1 rec, 6 yds
