= 2013 Louisiana Tech Bulldogs football team =

American college football season

2013 Louisiana Tech Bulldogs football
- Conference: Conference USA
- West Division
- Record: 4–8 (3–5 C-USA)
- Head coach: Skip Holtz (1st season)
- Offensive coordinator: Tony Petersen (1st season)
- Offensive scheme: Multiple
- Defensive coordinator: Kim Dameron (1st season)
- Base defense: Multiple
- Home stadium: Joe Aillet Stadium

2013 Conference USA football standings
| | Conf. | | | Overall |
| Team | W | | L | W | | L |
|---|---|---|---|---|---|---|
East Division
| Marshall x | 7 | – | 1 | 10 | – | 4 |
| East Carolina | 6 | – | 2 | 10 | – | 3 |
| Middle Tennessee | 6 | – | 2 | 8 | – | 5 |
| Florida Atlantic | 4 | – | 4 | 6 | – | 6 |
| UAB | 1 | – | 7 | 2 | – | 10 |
| Southern Miss | 1 | – | 7 | 1 | – | 11 |
| FIU | 1 | – | 7 | 1 | – | 11 |
West Division
| Rice x$ | 7 | – | 1 | 10 | – | 4 |
| UTSA | 6 | – | 2 | 7 | – | 5 |
| North Texas | 6 | – | 2 | 9 | – | 4 |
| Tulane | 5 | – | 3 | 7 | – | 6 |
| Louisiana Tech | 3 | – | 5 | 4 | – | 8 |
| Tulsa | 2 | – | 6 | 3 | – | 9 |
| UTEP | 1 | – | 7 | 2 | – | 10 |
Championship: Rice 41, Marshall 24
$ – Conference champion; x – Division champion/co-champions; Rankings from AP Poll

The 2013 Louisiana Tech Bulldogs football team represented Louisiana Tech University in the 2013 NCAA Division I FBS football season. The Bulldogs were led by first-year head coach Skip Holtz as a member of Conference USA (C-USA) in the West Division. The Dawgs played their home games at Joe Aillet Stadium in Ruston, Louisiana. This was the Bulldogs inaugural season as members of C-USA.

== Before the season ==
=== Recruiting ===
College recruiting (2013)
| Name | Hometown | School | Height | Weight | Commit date |
|---|---|---|---|---|---|
| Chris Aye; OL | Houston, TX | Cypress Ridge HS | 6 ft 4 in (1.93 m) | 290 lb (130 kg) | Feb 3, 2013 |
| Chris Aye; OL | Recruit ratings: Scout: Rivals: 247Sports: | | | | |
| Jonathan Barnes; PK | Baton Rouge, LA | Woodlawn HS | 5 ft 8 in (1.73 m) | 150 lb (68 kg) | Aug 4, 2012 |
| Jonathan Barnes; PK | Recruit ratings: Scout: Rivals: 247Sports: ESPN: | | | | |
| Mitchell Bell; OL | Houston, TX | Navarro College | 6 ft 4 in (1.93 m) | 330 lb (150 kg) | Jan 13, 2013 |
| Mitchell Bell; OL | Recruit ratings: Scout: Rivals: 247Sports: ESPN: | | | | |
| Nic Bickham; DE | St. Amant, LA | St. Amant HS | 6 ft 4 in (1.93 m) | 230 lb (100 kg) | Jun 11, 2012 |
| Nic Bickham; DE | Recruit ratings: Scout: Rivals: 247Sports: | | | | |
| DeAngelo Brooks; DT | Bossier City, LA | Kilgore College | 6 ft 1 in (1.85 m) | 290 lb (130 kg) | Jun 14, 2012 |
| DeAngelo Brooks; DT | Recruit ratings: Scout: Rivals: 247Sports: | | | | |
| Tre Carter; OL | Buena Vista, GA | Georgia Military College | 6 ft 3 in (1.91 m) | 285 lb (129 kg) | Jan 28, 2013 |
| Tre Carter; OL | Recruit ratings: Scout: Rivals: 247Sports: | | | | |
| Kevin Gary; WR | Snellville, GA | Georgia Military College | 6 ft 0 in (1.83 m) | 178 lb (81 kg) | Jan 28, 2013 |
| Kevin Gary; WR | Recruit ratings: Scout: Rivals: 247Sports: | | | | |
| Hakim Gray; DE | Keachi, LA | North DeSoto HS | 6 ft 3 in (1.91 m) | 250 lb (110 kg) | Jul 17, 2012 |
| Hakim Gray; DE | Recruit ratings: Scout: Rivals: 247Sports: ESPN: | | | | |
| Carlos Henderson; ATH | New Orleans, LA | McDonogh 35 HS | 5 ft 10 in (1.78 m) | 165 lb (75 kg) | Feb 6, 2013 |
| Carlos Henderson; ATH | Recruit ratings: Scout: Rivals: 247Sports: ESPN: | | | | |
| Michael Jacob; DB | Allen, TX | Allen HS | 5 ft 11 in (1.80 m) | 165 lb (75 kg) | Jan 20, 2013 |
| Michael Jacob; DB | Recruit ratings: Scout: Rivals: 247Sports: | | | | |
| Eddie Johnson; WR | Midlothian, TX | Navarro College | 6 ft 3 in (1.91 m) | 230 lb (100 kg) | Jan 20, 2013 |
| Eddie Johnson; WR | Recruit ratings: Scout: Rivals: 247Sports: | | | | |
| Tony Johnson; LB | Sulligent, AL | Southwest Mississippi CC | 6 ft 3 in (1.91 m) | 250 lb (110 kg) | Dec 19, 2012 |
| Tony Johnson; LB | Recruit ratings: Scout: Rivals: 247Sports: | | | | |
| Cam Manning; OL | Southlake, TX | Carroll HS | 6 ft 3 in (1.91 m) | 265 lb (120 kg) | Apr 12, 2012 |
| Cam Manning; OL | Recruit ratings: Scout: Rivals: 247Sports: ESPN: | | | | |
| Thomas McDonald; S | Houston, TX | Navarro College | 6 ft 3 in (1.91 m) | 180 lb (82 kg) | Feb 3, 2013 |
| Thomas McDonald; S | Recruit ratings: Scout: 247Sports: | | | | |
| Logan McPherson; P/K | Fort Payne, AL | Fort Payne HS | 5 ft 10 in (1.78 m) | 172 lb (78 kg) | Feb 3, 2013 |
| Logan McPherson; P/K | Recruit ratings: Scout: Rivals: 247Sports: ESPN: | | | | |
| Terrell Pinson; S | Tupelo, MS | Itawamba CC | 6 ft 3 in (1.91 m) | 210 lb (95 kg) | Jan 29, 2013 |
| Terrell Pinson; S | Recruit ratings: Scout: Rivals: 247Sports: ESPN: | | | | |
| Trent Taylor; WR | Shreveport, LA | Evangel Christian Academy | 5 ft 9 in (1.75 m) | 175 lb (79 kg) | Jul 17, 2012 |
| Trent Taylor; WR | Recruit ratings: Scout: Rivals: 247Sports: ESPN: | | | | |
| Nick Thomason; LB | Muscle Shoals, AL | Northeast Mississippi CC | 6 ft 1 in (1.85 m) | 235 lb (107 kg) | Dec 19, 2012 |
| Nick Thomason; LB | Recruit ratings: Scout: Rivals: 247Sports: | | | | |
| Mitch Villemez; LB | Hardin, TX | Blinn College | 6 ft 1 in (1.85 m) | 230 lb (100 kg) | Jan 13, 2013 |
| Mitch Villemez; LB | Recruit ratings: Scout: Rivals: 247Sports: | | | | |
| Xavier Woods; DB | West Monroe, LA | West Monroe HS | 5 ft 11 in (1.80 m) | 180 lb (82 kg) | Feb 6, 2013 |
| Xavier Woods; DB | Recruit ratings: Scout: Rivals: 247Sports: | | | | |
Overall recruit ranking:
Note: In many cases, Scout, Rivals, 247Sports, On3, and ESPN may conflict in their listings of height and weight.; In these cases, the average was taken. ESPN grades are on a 100-point scale.; Sources: "ESPN". ESPN.; "2013 Team Ranking". Rivals.com.

=== T–Day spring game ===
T–Day spring game

| Team | 1 | 2 | 3 | 4 | Total |
|---|---|---|---|---|---|
| Bulldogs | 7 | 10 | 0 | 10 | 27 |
| • La Tech | 21 | 17 | 0 | 0 | 38 |

- Date: April 13
- Location: Joe Aillet Stadium, Ruston, LA
- Game start: 1:00 p.m.
- Elapsed time: 2:00
- Game attendance: 5,700
- Game weather: 71 °F (22 °C), partly cloudy, winds ESE 5 mph (8.0 km/h)

Scoring summary
| 1 | 13:02 | Dawgs | Marlon Seets 10-yard run (Kyle Fischer kick) | Dawgs 0–7 |
| 1 | 8:08 | LaTech | Paul Turner 28-yard pass from Scotty Young (Troy Hunt kick) | Tied 7–7 |
| 1 | 3:42 | LaTech | Blake Martin 7-yard pass from Scotty Young (T.J. Kijak kick) | LaTech 14–7 |
| 1 | 1:15 | LaTech | I.K. Enemkpali 38-yard interception return (Kyle Fischer kick) | LaTech 21–7 |
| 2 | 14:04 | Dawgs | Kyle Fischer 41-yard field goal | LaTech 21–10 |
| 2 | 12:00 | LaTech | T.J. Kijak 45-yard field goal | LaTech 24–10 |
| 2 | 7:49 | LaTech | Rickey Courtney 7-yard run (Kyle Fischer kick) | LaTech 31–10 |
| 2 | 4:02 | Dawgs | Brandon Davis 3-yard run (T.J. Kijak kick) | LaTech 31–17 |
| 2 | 0:03 | LaTech | Paul Turner 9-yard pass from Scotty Young (Kyle Fischer kick) | LaTech 38–17 |
| 4 | 7:00 | Dawgs | Kyle Fischer 49-yard field goal | LaTech 38–20 |
| 4 | 2:40 | Dawgs | Travis Reyes 23-yard pass from Paul Harris (T.J. Kijak kick) | LaTech 38–27 |

The T–Day spring game was held at Joe Aillet Stadium on April 13, 2013.

== Schedule ==
| Date | Time | Opponent | Site | TV | Result | Attendance |
|---|---|---|---|---|---|---|
| August 31 | 11:30 am | at NC State* | Carter–Finley Stadium; Raleigh, NC | ACCN | L 14–40 | 54,204 |
| September 7 | 6:00 pm | Lamar* | Joe Aillet Stadium; Ruston, LA | | W 27–14 | 16,372 |
| September 12 | 6:30 pm | Tulane | Joe Aillet Stadium; Ruston, LA | FS1 | L 15–24 | 22,035 |
| September 21 | 11:00 am | at Kansas* | Memorial Stadium; Lawrence, KS | FS1 | L 10–13 | 39,823 |
| September 28 | 3:00 pm | vs. Army* | Cotton Bowl; Dallas, TX (Heart of Dallas Classic) | FS1 | L 16–35 | 31,278 |
| October 5 | 6:30 pm | at UTEP | Sun Bowl Stadium; El Paso, TX | CBSSN | W 38–35 | 24,926 |
| October 19 | 2:30 pm | North Texas^{†} | Joe Aillet Stadium; Ruston, LA | CBSSN | L 13–28 | 20,317 |
| October 26 | 5:00 pm | at FIU | FIU Stadium; Miami, FL | | W 23–7 | 13,389 |
| November 9 | 6:00 pm | Southern Miss | Joe Aillet Stadium; Ruston, LA (Rivalry in Dixie) | CBSSN | W 36–13 | 18,571 |
| November 16 | 6:00 pm | at Rice | Rice Stadium; Houston, TX | CBSSN | L 14–52 | 19,707 |
| November 23 | 6:00 pm | Tulsa | Joe Aillet Stadium; Ruston, LA | CBSSN | L 14–24 | 16,037 |
| November 30 | 2:30 pm | at UTSA | Alamodome; San Antonio, TX | CSS | L 10–30 | 26,549 |
*Non-conference game; ^{†}Homecoming; All times are in Central time

== Game summaries ==
=== At NC State ===
Louisiana Tech at NC State

| Team | 1 | 2 | 3 | 4 | Total |
|---|---|---|---|---|---|
| Bulldogs | 0 | 7 | 0 | 7 | 14 |
| • Wolfpack | 14 | 10 | 3 | 13 | 40 |

- Date: August 31
- Location: Carter–Finley Stadium
  Raleigh, NC
- Game start: 12:30 p.m. EDT
- Elapsed time: 3:15
- Game attendance: 54,204
- Game weather: 88 °F (31 °C), sunny, winds S 10 mph (16 km/h)
- Referee: David Epperley
- TV announcers (ACC Network): Steve Martin (play-by-play), David Archer (analyst), Rachel Baribeau (sideline)

Scoring summary
| 1 | 12:27 | NCSU | Tony Creecy 3-yard run (Niklas Sade kick) | NCSU 0–7 |
| 1 | 9:03 | NCSU | Matt Dayes 2-yard run (Niklas Sade kick) | NCSU 0–14 |
| 2 | 10:42 | NCSU | Niklas Sade 38-yard field goal | NCSU 0–17 |
| 2 | 2:39 | NCSU | Matt Dayes 2-yard run (Niklas Sade kick) | NCSU 0–24 |
| 2 | 0:27 | LaTech | Tevin King 1-yard run (Kyle Fischer kick) | NCSU 7–24 |
| 3 | 0:25 | NCSU | Niklas Sade 22-yard field goal | NCSU 7–27 |
| 4 | 14:06 | LaTech | Kenneth Dixon 12-yard run (Kyle Fischer kick) | NCSU 14–27 |
| 4 | 9:54 | NCSU | Niklas Sade 45-yard field goal | NCSU 14–30 |
| 4 | 7:13 | NCSU | Matt Dayes 18-yard run (Niklas Sade kick) | NCSU 14–37 |
| 4 | 3:48 | NCSU | Niklas Sade 24-yard field goal | NCSU 14–40 |

=== Lamar ===
Lamar at Louisiana Tech

| Team | 1 | 2 | 3 | 4 | Total |
|---|---|---|---|---|---|
| Cardinals | 0 | 7 | 7 | 0 | 14 |
| • Bulldogs | 7 | 7 | 3 | 10 | 27 |

- Date: September 7
- Location: Joe Aillet Stadium
  Ruston, LA
- Game start: 6:07 p.m. CDT
- Elapsed time: 3:08
- Game attendance: 16,372
- Game weather: 95 °F (35 °C), mostly sunny, winds N 5 mph (8.0 km/h)
- Referee: Steve LaMantia

Scoring summary
| 1 | 3:40 | LaTech | Jacarri Jackson 3-yard pass from Scotty Young (Kyle Fischer kick) | LaTech 7–0 |
| 2 | 5:23 | Lamar | Payton Ploch 1-yard run (Justin Stout kick) | Tied 7–7 |
| 2 | 2:00 | LaTech | Andrew Guillot 34-yard pass from Scotty Young (Kyle Fischer kick) | LaTech 14–7 |
| 3 | 3:03 | LaTech | Kyle Fischer 44-yard field goal | LaTech 17–7 |
| 4 | 10:56 | Lamar | Jordan Edwards 62-yard pass from Caleb Berry (Justin Stout kick) | LaTech 17–14 |
| 4 | 9:04 | LaTech | Kyle Fischer 49-yard field goal | LaTech 20–14 |
| 4 | 1:51 | LaTech | Andrew Guillot 19-yard run (Kyle Fischer kick) | LaTech 27–14 |

=== Tulane ===
Tulane at Louisiana Tech

| Team | 1 | 2 | 3 | 4 | Total |
|---|---|---|---|---|---|
| • Green Wave | 7 | 0 | 10 | 7 | 24 |
| Bulldogs | 6 | 3 | 0 | 6 | 15 |

- Date: September 12
- Location: Joe Aillet Stadium
  Ruston, LA
- Game start: 6:35 p.m. CDT
- Elapsed time: 3:40
- Game attendance: 22,035
- Game weather: 94 °F (34 °C), sunny, winds calm
- Referee: Clay Martin
- TV announcers (FOX Sports 1): Justin Kutcher (play-by-play), Petros Papadakis (color), Joel Klatt (analyst), Kristina Pink (sideline)

Scoring summary
| 1 | 9:49 | LaTech | Kyle Fischer 25-yard field goal | LaTech 3–0 |
| 1 | 6:03 | LaTech | Kyle Fischer 27-yard field goal | LaTech 6–0 |
| 1 | 3:18 | Tulane | Ryan Grant 24-yard pass from Nick Montana (Cairo Santos kick) | Tulane 6–7 |
| 2 | 10:41 | LaTech | Kyle Fischer 37-yard field goal | LaTech 9–7 |
| 3 | 12:00 | Tulane | Cairo Santos 51-yard field goal | Tulane 9–10 |
| 3 | 4:43 | Tulane | Xavier Rush 38-yard pass from Nick Montana (Cairo Santos kick) | Tulane 9–17 |
| 4 | 6:03 | Tulane | Orleans Darkwa 2-yard run (Cairo Santos kick) | Tulane 9–24 |
| 4 | 3:44 | LaTech | Trent Taylor 8-yard pass from Ryan Higgins (pass for 2-point conversion failed) | Tulane 15–24 |

=== At Kansas ===
Louisiana Tech at Kansas

| Team | 1 | 2 | 3 | 4 | Total |
|---|---|---|---|---|---|
| Bulldogs | 7 | 0 | 3 | 0 | 10 |
| • Jayhawks | 0 | 3 | 0 | 10 | 13 |

- Date: September 21
- Location: Memorial Stadium
  Lawrence, KS
- Game start: 11:05 a.m. CDT
- Elapsed time: 3:27
- Game attendance: 39,823
- Game weather: 66 °F (19 °C), sunny, winds SE 3 mph (4.8 km/h)
- Referee: Rick Loumiet
- TV announcers (FOX Sports 1): Justin Kutcher (play-by-play), James Bates (analyst), Brady Poppinga (sideline)

Scoring summary
| 1 | 0:06 | LaTech | Hunter Lee 8-yard pass from Ryan Higgins (Kyle Fischer kick) | LaTech 7–0 |
| 2 | 2:20 | Kansas | Matthew Wyman 39-yard field goal | LaTech 7–3 |
| 3 | 12:55 | LaTech | Kyle Fischer 39-yard field goal | LaTech 10–3 |
| 4 | 9:54 | Kansas | Jimmay Mundine 22-yard pass from Jake Heaps (Matthew Wyman kick) | Tied 10–10 |
| 4 | 0:00 | Kansas | Matthew Wyman 52-yard field goal | Kansas 10–13 |

=== Vs. Army ===
Army vs. Louisiana Tech
(Heart of Dallas Classic)

| Team | 1 | 2 | 3 | 4 | Total |
|---|---|---|---|---|---|
| • Black Knights | 14 | 7 | 7 | 7 | 35 |
| Bulldogs | 0 | 9 | 7 | 0 | 16 |

- Date: September 28
- Location: Cotton Bowl
  Dallas, TX
- Game start: 4:00 p.m. CDT
- Elapsed time: 3:43
- Game attendance: 31,278
- Game weather: Thunderstorms, 2 lightning delays (60 min, 45 min)
- Referee: Clay Martin
- TV announcers (FOX Sports 1): Justin Kutcher (play-by-play), James Bates (analyst), Brady Poppinga (sideline)

Scoring summary
| 1 | 8:08 | Army | Terry Baggett 9-yard run (Daniel Grochowski kick) | Army 0–7 |
| 1 | 0:03 | Army | Terry Baggett 14-yard run (Daniel Grochowski kick) | Army 0–14 |
| 2 | 7:29 | LaTech | Andrew Guillot 29-yard pass from Ryan Higgins (PAT failed) | Army 6–14 |
| 2 | 0:59 | Army | Aaron Kemper 3-yard run (Daniel Grochowski kick) | Army 6–21 |
| 2 | 0:00 | LaTech | Kyle Fischer 31-yard field goal | Army 9–21 |
| 3 | 9:56 | Army | Angel Santiago 1-yard run (Daniel Grochowski kick) | Army 9–28 |
| 3 | 6:32 | LaTech | Kenneth Dixon 7-yard run (Kyle Fischer kick) | Army 16–28 |
| 4 | 8:52 | Army | Kelvin White 1-yard run (Daniel Grochowski kick) | Army 16–35 |

=== At UTEP ===
Louisiana Tech at UTEP

| Team | 1 | 2 | 3 | 4 | Total |
|---|---|---|---|---|---|
| • Bulldogs | 14 | 10 | 7 | 7 | 38 |
| Miners | 7 | 7 | 14 | 7 | 35 |

- Date: October 5
- Location: Sun Bowl Stadium
  El Paso, TX
- Game start: 5:24 p.m. MDT
- Elapsed time: 3:42
- Game attendance: 24,926
- Game weather: 76 °F (24 °C), clear, winds 7 mph (11 km/h)
- Referee: Steve LaMantia
- TV announcers (CBS Sports Network): Dave Ryan (play-by-play), Adam Archuleta (analyst), Susannah Collins (sideline)

Scoring summary
| 1 | 11:17 | UTEP | Jameill Showers 1-yard run (Jay Mattox kick) | UTEP 0–7 |
| 1 | 10:14 | LaTech | Andrew Guillot 5-yard run (Kyle Fischer kick) | Tied 7–7 |
| 1 | 0:44 | LaTech | Ryan Higgins 7-yard run (Kyle Fischer kick) | LaTech 14–7 |
| 2 | 10:13 | LaTech | Blake Martin 62-yard run (Kyle Fischer kick) | LaTech 21–7 |
| 2 | 3:57 | LaTech | Kyle Fischer 24-yard field goal | LaTech 24–7 |
| 2 | 1:45 | UTEP | Jordan Leslie 28-yard pass from Jameill Showers (Jay Mattox kick) | LaTech 24–14 |
| 3 | 11:30 | UTEP | Trey Brown 0-yard fumble return (Jay Mattox kick) | LaTech 24–21 |
| 3 | 7:53 | LaTech | Ryan Higgins 2-yard run (Kyle Fischer kick) | LaTech 31–21 |
| 3 | 6:27 | UTEP | Jordan Leslie 65-yard pass from Jameill Showers (Jay Mattox kick) | LaTech 31–28 |
| 4 | 13:45 | LaTech | Kenneth Dixon 9-yard run (Kyle Fischer kick) | LaTech 38–28 |
| 4 | 1:03 | UTEP | Craig Wenrick 6-yard pass from Jameill Showers (Jay Mattox kick) | LaTech 38–35 |

=== North Texas ===
North Texas at Louisiana Tech

| Team | 1 | 2 | 3 | 4 | Total |
|---|---|---|---|---|---|
| • Mean Green | 0 | 14 | 14 | 0 | 28 |
| Bulldogs | 7 | 3 | 0 | 3 | 13 |

- Date: October 19
- Location: Joe Aillet Stadium
  Ruston, LA
- Game start: 2:34 p.m. CDT
- Elapsed time: 3:11
- Game attendance: 20,317
- Game weather: 64 °F (18 °C), overcast, winds NNW 11 mph (18 km/h)
- Referee: Brad Rogers
- TV announcers (CBS Sports Network): Brad Johansen (play-by-play), Randy Cross (analyst), Rashan Ali (sideline)

Scoring summary
| 1 | 7:50 | LaTech | Ryan Higgins 2-yard run (Kyle Fischer kick) | LaTech 7–0 |
| 2 | 6:13 | LaTech | Kyle Fischer 40-yard field goal | LaTech 10–0 |
| 2 | 3:53 | UNT | Brelan Chancellor 61-yard pass from Derek Thompson (Zach Paul kick) | LaTech 10–7 |
| 2 | 2:05 | UNT | Zac Whitfield 56-yard interception return (Zach Paul kick) | UNT 10–14 |
| 3 | 7:05 | UNT | Derek Thompson 3-yard run (Zach Paul kick) | UNT 10–21 |
| 3 | 0:40 | UNT | Brandin Byrd 1-yard run (Zach Paul kick) | UNT 10–28 |
| 4 | 12:27 | LaTech | Kyle Fischer 35-yard field goal | UNT 13–28 |

| Statistics | UNT | LT |
|---|---|---|
| First downs | 20 | 20 |
| Total yards | 386 | 404 |
| Rushing yards | 165 | 37 |
| Passing yards | 221 | 367 |
| Turnovers | 1 | 3 |
| Time of possession | 32:51 | 27:09 |

| Team | Category | Player | Statistics |
|---|---|---|---|
| North Texas | Passing | Derek Thompson | 16/24, 221 yards, TD, INT |
| North Texas | Rushing | Brandin Byrd | 14 carries, 71 yards, TD |
| North Texas | Receiving | Brelan Chancellor | 5 receptions, 95 yards, TD |
| Louisiana Tech | Passing | Ryan Higgins | 36/54, 343 yards, 2 INT |
| Louisiana Tech | Rushing | Kenneth Dixon | 12 carries, 25 yards |
| Louisiana Tech | Receiving | Andrew Guillot | 10 receptions, 99 yards |

=== At FIU ===
Louisiana Tech at FIU

| Team | 1 | 2 | 3 | 4 | Total |
|---|---|---|---|---|---|
| • Bulldogs | 6 | 3 | 3 | 11 | 23 |
| Panthers | 0 | 0 | 7 | 0 | 7 |

- Date: October 26
- Location: FIU Stadium
  Miami, FL
- Game start: 6:01 p.m. EDT
- Elapsed time: 2:54
- Game attendance: 13,389
- Game weather: 80 °F (27 °C), partly cloudy, winds 11 mph (18 km/h)
- Referee: Wayne Winkler

Scoring summary
| 1 | 9:01 | LaTech | Kyle Fischer 26-yard field goal | LaTech 3–0 |
| 1 | 0:49 | LaTech | Kyle Fischer 35-yard field goal | LaTech 6–0 |
| 2 | 3:46 | LaTech | Kyle Fischer 33-yard field goal | LaTech 9–0 |
| 3 | 14:11 | FIU | Jonnu Smith 38-yard pass from Jake Medlock (Austin Taylor kick) | LaTech 9–7 |
| 3 | 7:09 | LaTech | Kyle Fischer 30-yard field goal | LaTech 12–7 |
| 4 | 8:35 | LaTech | Kenneth Dixon 39-yard pass from Ryan Higgins (Ryan Higgins pass to Sterling Griffin for 2-point conversion) | LaTech 20–7 |
| 4 | 4:20 | LaTech | Kyle Fischer 35-yard field goal | LaTech 23–7 |

=== Southern Miss ===
Southern Miss at Louisiana Tech
(Rivalry in Dixie)

| Team | 1 | 2 | 3 | 4 | Total |
|---|---|---|---|---|---|
| Golden Eagles | 0 | 6 | 0 | 7 | 13 |
| • Bulldogs | 9 | 7 | 6 | 14 | 36 |

- Date: November 9
- Location: Joe Aillet Stadium
  Ruston, LA
- Game start: 6:04 p.m. CST
- Elapsed time: 3:36
- Game attendance: 18,571
- Game weather: 51 °F (11 °C), light rain, winds SE 1 mph (1.6 km/h)
- Referee: Joe Pester
- TV announcers (CBS Sports Network): Dave Ryan (play-by-play), Mark Tauscher (analyst), Evan Washburn (sideline)

Scoring summary
| 1 | 11:48 | LaTech | Team safety | LaTech 2–0 |
| 1 | 7:11 | LaTech | Trent Taylor 13-yard pass from Scotty Young (Kyle Fischer kick) | LaTech 9–0 |
| 2 | 11:37 | USM | Corey Acosta 22-yard field goal | LaTech 9–3 |
| 2 | 0:27 | LaTech | Sterling Griffin 3-yard pass from Scotty Young (Kyle Fischer kick) | LaTech 16–3 |
| 2 | 0:00 | USM | Corey Acosta 50-yard field goal | LaTech 16–6 |
| 3 | 11:04 | LaTech | Kyle Fischer 38-yard field goal | LaTech 19–6 |
| 3 | 2:13 | LaTech | Kyle Fischer 43-yard field goal | LaTech 22–6 |
| 4 | 9:26 | LaTech | Hunter Lee 8-yard run (Kyle Fischer kick) | LaTech 29–6 |
| 4 | 6:55 | LaTech | Kenneth Dixon 1-yard run (Kyle Fischer kick) | LaTech 36–6 |
| 4 | 0:56 | USM | Kyle Sloter 8-yard pass from Nick Mullens (Corey Acosta kick) | LaTech 36–13 |

=== At Rice ===
Louisiana Tech at Rice

| Team | 1 | 2 | 3 | 4 | Total |
|---|---|---|---|---|---|
| Bulldogs | 0 | 0 | 7 | 7 | 14 |
| • Owls | 14 | 10 | 7 | 21 | 52 |

- Date: November 16
- Location: Rice Stadium
  Houston, TX
- Game start: 6:04 p.m. CST
- Elapsed time: 3:11
- Game attendance: 19,707
- Game weather: 77 °F (25 °C), light mist, winds S 15–20 mph (24–32 km/h)
- Referee: Ken Antee
- TV announcers (CBS Sports Network): Dave Ryan (play-by-play), Adam Archuleta (analyst), Evan Washburn (sideline)

=== Tulsa ===
Tulsa at Louisiana Tech

| Team | 1 | 2 | 3 | 4 | Total |
|---|---|---|---|---|---|
| • Golden Hurricane | 7 | 3 | 7 | 7 | 24 |
| Bulldogs | 0 | 7 | 7 | 0 | 14 |

- Date: November 23
- Location: Joe Aillet Stadium
  Ruston, LA
- Game start: 6:04 p.m. CST
- Elapsed time: 3:16
- Game attendance: 16,037
- Game weather: 42 °F (6 °C), cloudy and cold
- Referee: Steve Barth
- TV announcers (CBS Sports Network): Brent Stover (play-by-play), Corey Chavous (analyst), Lisa Byington (sideline)

=== At UTSA ===
Louisiana Tech at UTSA

| Team | 1 | 2 | 3 | 4 | Total |
|---|---|---|---|---|---|
| Bulldogs | 3 | 7 | 0 | 0 | 10 |
| • Roadrunners | 14 | 3 | 7 | 6 | 30 |

- Date: November 30
- Location: Alamodome
  San Antonio, TX
- Game start: 2:37 p.m. CST
- Elapsed time: 2:55
- Game attendance: 26,549
- Game weather: 72 °F (22 °C), indoors
- Referee: Chris Snead
- TV announcers (CSS): Dave Raymond (play-by-play), N.D. Kalu (analyst), Julia Morales (sideline)

== After the season ==
=== NFL draft ===
In May's 2014 NFL draft, Justin Ellis was selected by the Oakland Raiders in the fourth round, and IK Enemkpali was selected by the New York Jets in the sixth round.

| Rnd. | Pick | Team | Player | Pos. | College | Notes |
|---|---|---|---|---|---|---|
| 4 | 107 | Oakland Raiders | Justin Ellis | DT | Louisiana Tech | |
| 6 | 210 | New York Jets | IK Enemkpali | DE | Louisiana Tech | |

== Roster ==
2013 Louisiana Tech Bulldogs football team roster
Players
Coaches
Offense

| Pos. | # | Name | Class |
|---|---|---|---|
| WR | 1 | Richie Casey | Sr |
| RB | 2 | Lyle Fitte | Sr |
| WR | 3 | Paul Turner | So |
| WR | 4 | Sterling Griffin | Sr |
| WR | 5 | D.J. Banks | Sr |
| QB | 6 | Sean Berman | Sr |
| QB | 7 | Paul Harris | Sr |
| WR | 8 | Jacarri Jackson | Sr |
| QB | 9 | Zach Griffith | Jr |
| WR | 10 | Jaydrick DeClouette | Fr |
| WR | 11 | Conner Smith | Fr |
| QB | 13 | Chase Schultz | Fr |
| QB | 14 | Ryan Higgins | Fr |
| QB | 16 | Scotty Young | Jr |
| QB | 17 | Andy McAlindon | So |
| WR | 18 | D.J. St. Julien | Jr |
| WR | 19 | Andrew Guillot | Sr |
| RB | 23 | Rickey Courtney | Sr |
| RB | 24 | Marlon Seets | So |
| RB | 25 | Blake Martin | So |
| RB | 26 | Tevin King | Fr |
| RB | 27 | Boston Scott | Fr |
| RB | 27 | James Banks | Jr |
| RB | 28 | Kenneth Dixon | So |
| RB | 36 | Hunter Lee | Jr |
| OL | 55 | Alec Davis | Sr |
| OL | 57 | Richard Greenwalt | Jr |
| OL | 60 | Ross Lodge | Fr |
| OL | 61 | Matthew Conger | Sr |
| OL | 62 | Joseph Brunson | Fr |
| OL | 63 | Chris Aye | Fr |
| OL | 66 | Matthew Shepherd | Sr |
| OL | 67 | Tre Carter | Jr |
| OL | 68 | Josh Robinson | So |
| OL | 69 | Vince Cano | Sr |
| OL | 70 | Clayton Landry | Fr |
| OL | 72 | Jeremy Graffree | Sr |
| OL | 74 | Larry Banks | Sr |
| OL | 75 | Darrell Brown | Fr |
| OL | 76 | Zeke Alsander | So |
| OL | 77 | Jens Danielson | Jr |
| OL | 78 | Mitchell Bell | Jr |
| OL | 79 | Cam Manning | Fr |
| WR | 80 | Jon Greenwalt | Sr |
| WR | 81 | Scott Cathcart | Sr |
| WR | 83 | Kevin Gary | So |
| WR | 85 | Trent Taylor | Fr |
| WR | 87 | Grant Childress | Fr |
| WR | 88 | Eddie Johnson | Jr |
| WR | 89 | Terome Grant | Jr |
| OL | 97 | Jeremy Long | Sr |

Defense

| Pos. | # | Name | Class |
|---|---|---|---|
| LB | 6 | Beau Fitte | So |
| DB | 11 | Lloyd Grogan | Fr |
| DB | 13 | Le'Vander Liggins | Jr |
| DB | 14 | Thaddaeus Medford | Fr |
| CB | 15 | Bryson Abraham | So |
| DB | 16 | Jabari Prewitt | Jr |
| S | 18 | Connor Nichols | Jr |
| DB | 19 | Ronnie Fields | Jr |
| DB | 20 | Colby Brown | Jr |
| DB | 21 | Adairius Barnes | So |
| DE | 22 | Kendrick James | Sr |
| DB | 23 | Kentrell Brice | So |
| LB | 24 | Nick Thomason | Jr |
| CB | 27 | Josh Ross | Sr |
| DB | 29 | Kendall Hayes | Jr |
| DB | 30 | Ahmad Wallace | Sr |
| S | 31 | Terrell Pinson | Jr |
| LB | 32 | Mitch Villemez | Jr |
| S | 33 | Thomas McDonald | Jr |
| LB | 34 | Mike Schrang | Jr |
| DB | 35 | C.J. Cleveland | So |
| S | 37 | Michael Mims | Fr |
| DB | 38 | Michael Jacob | Fr |
| DB | 39 | Xavier Woods | Fr |
| DE | 40 | Kevin Kisseberth | Jr |
| DL | 41 | I.K. Enemkpali | Sr |
| S | 44 | Austin Ginn | Fr |
| DL | 45 | Vernon Butler | So |
| LB | 47 | Daniel Cobb | Sr |
| LB | 48 | Andre Wiggins | So |
| LB | 52 | Ty Hook | So |
| LB | 54 | Trent Norman | So |
| LB | 56 | Tony Johnson | Jr |
| DL | 58 | Devon McKinney | Jr |
| DL | 70 | Justin Ellis | Sr |
| DL | 84 | Andre Taylor | Jr |
| DL | 88 | Tyler Porter | So |
| DT | 90 | DeAngelo Brooks | Jr |
| DL | 91 | Aaron Brown | Fr |
| DL | 92 | Carter Street | Jr |
| DL | 93 | Stephen Gibson | Fr |
| DT | 94 | Shakeil Lucas | Sr |
| DE | 95 | Hakim Gray | Fr |
| DL | 98 | Vontarrius Dora | So |
| DL | 99 | Malcolm Pichon | So |

Special teams

| Pos. | # | Name | Class |
|---|---|---|---|
| K | 17 | Kyle Fischer | So |
| P | 28 | Gerald Shouse | So |
| K | 35 | Jonathan Barnes | Fr |
| P/K | 43 | Logan McPherson | Fr |
| DS | 51 | Josh Cuthbert | Sr |
| DS | 53 | Darrell Travis | Fr |
| ATH | 86 | Carlos Henderson | Fr |

Head coach

- Skip Holtz

Coordinators/assistant coaches

- Tony Petersen (Offensive coordinator)
- Kim Dameron (Defensive coordinator)
- Matt Moore (Assistant head coach / offensive line)
- Stan Eggen (Defensive line / recruiting coordinator)
- Ronnie Bradford (Defensive backs / special teams)
- Jeff Koonz (Linebackers)
- Jabbar Juluke (Running backs)
- Tim Rattay (Wide receivers)
- Joe Sloan (Inside receivers)
- Kurt Hester (Strength and conditioning)
- Ed Jackson (Character education coordinator)

Legend

- (C) Team captain
- (S) Suspended
- (I) Ineligible
- Injured
- Redshirt

Roster
Last update: October 9, 2013
