= Nova Studios =

American gay pornographic film studio

Nova Studios was an independent gay pornographic film studio established by Scott Masters in 1977. It closed in 1986.

== Genesis of the studio ==
In 1969, Masters (then using the pseudonym "Robert Walters") began producing hardcore gay male nude magazines. By the end of the year, he was producing as many as six magazines a month.

In 1970, Masters produced his first film, Drilled Deep. It was a "loop" (an 8mm short film, roughly 200 feet in length, designed to run over and over in peep shows), and starred Jim Cassidy—at the time a popular underground hardcore gay porn star. To distribute his films, Masters established his first adult film business, The Stephens Agency. While Masters directed and produced films on a contract basis for distributors, he retained the right to sell the loops via direct mail. The Stephens Agency was his direct mail operation. Masters closed the distribution business in 1972 because it was unprofitable. However, he continued to direct loops, working alongside former Hollywood lighting technician and cinematographer Jim Randall.

Despite a conviction in Texas in 1970 for obscenity, by 1976 Masters had directed more than 100 loops.

In 1973, Masters directed his first feature-length hardcore gay adult film. The film was Greek Lightning, produced for Jaguar Productions and starring gay porn star Jimmy Hughes.

In late 1973, Masters founded In Touch (now known as In Touch for Men), a softcore gay porn magazine. But after two years, Masters turned over management of the magazine to a third party (while retaining ownership).

== Nova Studios ==
In 1976, Masters (still using the name Robert Walters) founded Nova Studios. The inspiration for the company came from a competitor's success. In 1972, Falcon Studios had opened its doors in San Francisco. Distributing its films through direct mail as well as adult bookstores, the studio was able to charge high prices. This improved the budget for Falcon's loops, leading to higher-quality films. Realizing that direct mail might be profitable again, Masters spent most of 1976 raising capital to form Nova Studios.

Nova Studios' first production was Tubtricks (1976). Masters had decided to produce loops which ran to more than 400 feet, extending the film's running time to nearly 20 minutes. Tubtricks was shot in a San Francisco gay bathhouse, and featured a complex orgy at its conclusion. The film co-starred Lee Marlin and Ken Carter, both of whom would later become notable sex performers and work for important directors such as Tom DeSimone, Jack Deveau, William Higgins and Mark Reynolds.

Tubtricks was a major success. Masters followed up the film with a series of wildly popular long loops: Kept After School, Beached, Tricking, Hot Lunch, Jocks, That Boy Next Door and Down on the Farm.

=== The "West Coast Look" ===
Under Masters, Nova Studios developed the "West Coast Look" of gay pornography. As noted in a published history of Nova Studios, the West Coast Look was a very stylized and highly planned filmmaking style. Films were like staged plays, and contained extremely linear story-telling. "Tight transitions" were inserted between each scene to add continuity and establish setting, mood, and theme. Each scene sequenced almost formulaically "from master shot to medium shot to close-up, with frequent returns to the master shot. (By re-establishing the overall shot so often, Walters made viewers feel that they were viewing the action from the best seat in the house, not from within the circle of action itself.)" The lighting was strong, and tended to eliminate shadows and expose flaws in the performers' skin. Models' hair was carefully groomed, make-up was used, and cleanliness emphasized.

=== Establishing gay porn tropes ===
Nova Studios established a number of tropes now common to gay adult film:

- Heavy emphasis on sexual fantasy - Nova Studios productions often featured sex in settings not generally considered "gay" at that time, such as factories, garages, locker rooms or barns. The studio focused on the fantasy of "sex with a straight man" or "sex between straight men," and played heavily on the idea that "gay sex can happen where you least expect it."
- Gay-for-pay performers - Nova Studios films did not depict characters as gay. The personality or sexual identity of each character was left ambiguous at best, and more often decidedly heterosexual. "The point, above all, was to show 'hot guys having gay sex,' not gay guys having hot sex'."
- Partially clothed sex - Nova Studios pioneered the idea of leaving one piece of clothing on the performers during the sex act. This usually was a pair of white athletic socks with colorful stripes on the top, a visual which became nearly ubiquitous in gay pornography until the late 1980s. Athletic shoes, work boots, cleats and even complete uniforms (such as a policeman's shirt and pants, or a football player's pads, jersey and jockstrap) would remain on the model. The concept was to continually remind the viewer of the fantasy setting in which the sex occurred.
- An emphasis on youth - Although most of the models cast in Nova Studios productions were in their late 20s and early 30s, the setting and story used in the films emphasized the youth of the models. In some cases, the films implied through the use of dialogue, setting or behavior that some of the characters were under the age of 18.
- Incest themes - Beginning with the film His Little Brother (produced in 1978), Nova Studios often included incest in its films. Although none of the models were, in fact, siblings, Nova Studios often gave them the same last name as their stage name to heighten the impression that the models were brothers. Other aspects of the films—the performers occupy the same house, or appear to have the same parents, or seem to have a brotherly relationship in school or at home—also contribute to the impression that incest is occurring.
- "The natural look" - Except for its last films, Nova Studios productions featured performers who were "not some Olympus of demi-gods, all gym-buffed, parlor-tanned, and blow-dried. Instead, Nova, offered a down-to-earth collection of real individuals, each with his own sex appeal and identity. The 'typical' Nova model has a lean, natural build which looked even heftier (as did the cock) if the model was short but well proportioned." Expressive eyes and wide, friendly smiles were also very common.
- Sexual chemistry - Nova Studios performers were often sexually ambivalent individuals who were strongly aroused (rather than turned off) by same-gender sex. Nova Studios sought out thrill-seekers who would be excited by the prospect of sex on film or sex for money, or escorts who wanted to have sex with men their own age for once.
- Structured story lines - "The majority of Nova's releases had a story to tell, with clear transitions and an element of dramatic conflict. And Walters liked to end his little tales with a comical or O. Henry-esque twist: a signature of his Nova work."
- Structured sexual performances - The nature of Nova Studios' guerrilla filmmaking required that the studio plan to the last detail the shots producers wanted in films. Time was of the essence while shooting, which required rigorous planning. While this occasionally drained the scenes of spontaneity, more often than not they created richly layered sexual performances lacking in the jerky, heavily edited performances rife with jump cuts which characterize most gay adult film in the 2000s.

=== Marketing innovation ===
Nova Studios also pioneered a new marketing technique, the glossy brochure. To help sell films, which were nearly triple the cost of most loops, Nova Studios produced 16-page, full-color, glossy brochures. Each brochure contained nearly 70 small photographs of the film's action.

== Theft and embezzlement ==
Nova Studios began licensing many of Scott Masters' pre-Nova loops and early Nova Studios material on video in 1980. Unbeknownst to Nova, however, Masters' lover (who had acted as the studio's chief of production and financial manager) had been licensing much of the same material over and over to a wide variety of customers without permission. As this material began to flood the marketplace (much of it in degraded quality), the studio's financial situation deteriorated significantly.

Masters attempted to keep Nova Studios afloat by finally producing sound films. Masters had refused to make films with synchronous sound until 1983—long after most other gay pornographic studios had not only begun using dialogue synched to the actor's lip movements but also had moved from film to video. Masters' friend, William Higgins, had been recording sound for his films (but not using it) since 1978, and Falcon Studios released their first sound film in 1979. "I hated sound at this time. Because of my experience with Greek Lightning, partially, and I said, 'What will sound do for these films except make them ludicrous?' Because the kind of people we use in these films can't talk, can't act, have no background—they can't do any of these things, and it's just going to be absurd to make them say things when they aren't going to say them well."

In 1981, Nova Studios bowed to public demand and financial pressures and produced It's the Life. The film was a disaster. Star Giorgio Canali's English was so poor that he mangled his lines. Struggling to recite dialogue in an unfamiliar language, Canali could not maintain an erection. Masters eventually gave up and shot the rest of the scene without sound. Nova Studios would not produce a sound film again until 1983. That film would be Brian's Boys, starring Brian Hawks. But in the intervening two years, Nova Studios lost critical market share.

The same year, Nova Studio began dubbing older silent loops. The company added music, limited narration, and asynchronous sexual sounds to the older films and began re-releasing these to make money.

Nova Studios also continued to find bright young performers. During 1983, the studio would discover and cast such notable adult film performers as Rick Donovan, Jim Bentley, Tim Kramer and Danny Connors.

In 1984, Nova Studios hired Chet Thomas. Thomas was an editor, and he worked on several of Nova's final films. They also released their final two sync-sound productions, Heroes (which featured the debut of Cole Taylor) and Something Wild, with the above stars as well as Scott Avery, Bobby Madison/Brian Michaels, and Randy Page.

But that same year, Masters' partner embezzled the company's bank account and fled with the master print of the latest Nova Studio release, Boys Town. The company subsequently discovered that the company's taxes had also not been paid for several years. Faced with a large tax bill and $60,000 in debt, Nova Studios licensed the remainder of the company's products to a third party.

Nova Studios ceased to make gay adult films in late 1986.

== Post-Nova Studios ==
In 1987, Masters was hired by Catalina Video. Catalina Video had been distributing Nova Studios' films to adult bookstores and video stores since about 1982. With Nova Studios in financial distress, Catalina and Nova Studios struck a deal: Catalina would purchase the rights to the unreleased Boys Town. Masters would be free to sell the rights to all other Nova Studios films to another vendor. Catalina would also hire Masters as its head of production, where he would be free to write and direct films on an occasional basis.

Masters sold the rights to nearly all of Nova Studios' films to L.A. Video. L.A. Video entered bankruptcy a few years later, leaving the rights to all of Nova Studios' products in legal limbo.

Given the transition in his life, Masters stopped using the name "Robert Walters" and adopted a new stage name, Scott Masters.

Once at Catalina, Masters also hired Chet Thomas, his former editor at Nova Studios, to be a full-time director. Thomas subsequently became a notable gay adult film director in his own right.
