= 2016 Armed Forces Bowl =

American college football game

2016 Lockheed Martin Armed Forces Bowl
- 14th Armed Forces Bowl
Louisiana Tech Bulldogs	Navy Midshipmen
(8–5)	(9–4)
C-USA	The American
48	45
Head coach: Skip Holtz	Head coach: Ken Niumatalolo
	CFP 25
	1	2	3	4	Total
Louisiana Tech	17	14	0	17	48
Navy	7	17	7	14	45
- Date: December 23, 2016
- Season: 2016
- Stadium: Amon G. Carter Stadium
- Location: Fort Worth, Texas
- MVP: Trent Taylor (La. Tech-WR); Zach Abey (Navy-QB)
- Favorite: Navy by 1
- Referee: Larry Smith (MAC)
- Attendance: 40,542
- Payout: US$675,000

United States TV coverage
- Network: ESPN; RedVoice, LLC
- Announcers: Roy Philpott, Tom Ramsey, Kris Budden (ESPN); Brian Estridge, John Denton, Landry Burdine (RedVoice)

The 2016 Armed Forces Bowl was a post-season American college football bowl game played on December 23, 2016, at Amon G. Carter Stadium in Fort Worth, Texas. The fourteenth annual edition of the Armed Forces Bowl was one of the 2016–17 bowl games that concluded the 2016 FBS football season. The game was officially named the Lockheed Martin Armed Forces Bowl after its corporate sponsor Lockheed Martin.

== Team selection ==
The game featured the Louisiana Tech Bulldogs against the Navy Midshipmen.

This was the third meeting between the schools, with Navy winning both previous ones. The most recent meeting was on September 18, 2010, where the Midshipmen defeated the Bulldogs by a score of 37–23.

== Game summary ==
=== Scoring summary ===
Scoring summary

Quarter	Time	Drive			Team	Scoring information	Score	
Quarter	Time	Plays	Yards	TOP	Team	Scoring information	La. Tech	Navy
1	13:35	4	16	1:25	La. Tech	Ryan Higgins 1-yard touchdown run, Jonathan Barnes kick good	7	0
1	9:48	8	48	3:03	La. Tech	22-yard field goal by Jonathan Barnes	10	0
1	4:04	8	55	2:46	Navy	Zach Abey 3-yard touchdown run, Bennett Moehring kick good	10	7
1	0:18	9	66	3:39	La. Tech	Trent Taylor 19-yard touchdown reception from Ryan Higgins, Jonathan Barnes kick good	17	7
2	14:49	2	73	0:24	Navy	Darryl Bonner 64-yard touchdown reception from Zach Abey, Bennett Moehring kick good	17	14
2	11:17	3	52	1:47	Navy	Zach Abey 2-yard touchdown run, Bennett Moehring kick good	17	21
2	7:15	9	65	4:02	La. Tech	Carlos Henderson 3-yard touchdown reception from Ryan Higgins, Jonathan Barnes kick good	24	21
2	2:02	10	41	5:07	Navy	40-yard field goal by Bennett Noehring	24	24
2	0:35	6	83	1:22	La. Tech	Trent Taylor 51-yard touchdown reception from Ryan Higgins, Jonathan Barnes kick good	31	24
3	7:53	14	90	7:02	Navy	Chris High 24-yard touchdown run, Bennett Moehring kick good	31	31
4	13:10	6	70	26	La. Tech	Boston Scott 12-yard touchdown run, Jonathan Barnes kick good	38	31
4	9:05	10	75	4:05	Navy	Chris High 9-yard touchdown run, Bennett Moehring kick good	38	38
4	4:12	10	72	4:48	La. Tech	Carlos Henderson 4-yard touchdown reception from Ryan Higgins, Jonathan Barnes kick good	45	38
4	3:46	2	75	0:20	Navy	Malcolm Perry 30-yard touchdown run, Bennett Moehring kick good	45	45
4	0:00	9	70	3:40	La. Tech	32-yard field goal by Jonathan Barnes	48	45
"TOP" = time of possession. For other American football terms, see Glossary of American football.							48	45

=== Statistics ===
	1	2	3	4	Total
Bulldogs	17	14	0	17	48
Midshipmen	7	17	7	14	45

Statistics	La. Tech	Navy
First downs	31	25
Total offense, plays – yards	73–497	61–459
Rushes-yards (net)	33–88 (2.7)	49–300 (6.1)
Passing yards (net)	409	159
Passes, Comp-Att-Int	29–40–0	7–12–0
Time of Possession	31:31	28:29

Team	Category	Player	Statistics
La. Tech	Passing	Ryan Higgins	29/40, 409 yds, 4 TD
La. Tech	Rushing	Jarred Craft	17 car, 63 yds
La. Tech	Receiving	Trent Taylor	12 rec, 233 yds, 2 TD
Navy	Passing	Zach Abey	7/12, 159 yds, 1 TD
Navy	Rushing	Zach Abey	25 car, 114 yds, 2 TD
Navy	Receiving	Darryl Bonner	2 rec, 79 yds, 1 TD
