= Trent Taylor =

American football player (born 1994)

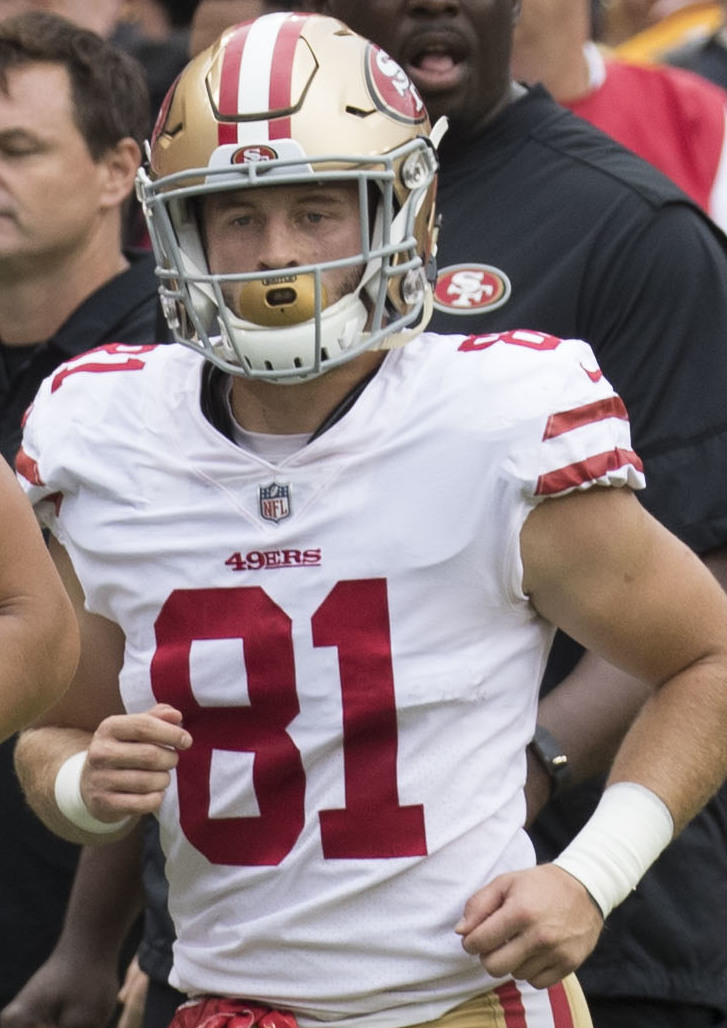
- Taylor with the San Francisco 49ers in 2017

No. 81, 15, 11
- Position: Wide receiver

Personal information
- Born: April 30, 1994 (age 32); Cookeville, Tennessee, U.S.
- Listed height: 5 ft 8 in (1.73 m)
- Listed weight: 180 lb (82 kg)

Career information
- High school: Evangel Christian Academy (Shreveport, Louisiana)
- College: Louisiana Tech (2013–2016)
- NFL draft: 2017: 5th round, 177th overall pick

Career history
- San Francisco 49ers (2017–2020); Cincinnati Bengals (2021–2022); Chicago Bears (2023); San Francisco 49ers (2024–2025)

Awards and highlights
- First-team All-C-USA (2015, 2016); Second-team All-C-USA (2014)

Career NFL statistics
- Receptions: 88
- Receiving yards: 845
- Return yards: 1,157
- Total touchdowns: 3
- Stats at Pro Football Reference

Trent Nelson Taylor (born April 30, 1994) is an American former professional football player who was a wide receiver in the National Football League (NFL). He played college football for the Louisiana Tech Bulldogs and was selected by the San Francisco 49ers in the fifth round of the 2017 NFL draft. Taylor also played for the Cincinnati Bengals and Chicago Bears.

== Early life ==
Taylor attended Evangel Christian Academy in Shreveport, Louisiana, where he played high school football for the Eagles. As a junior, Taylor had 65 receptions for 1,075 yards and 18 touchdowns, and as a senior, he had 107 receptions for 1,650 yards and 20 touchdowns. Taylor committed to Louisiana Tech University to play college football.

== College career ==
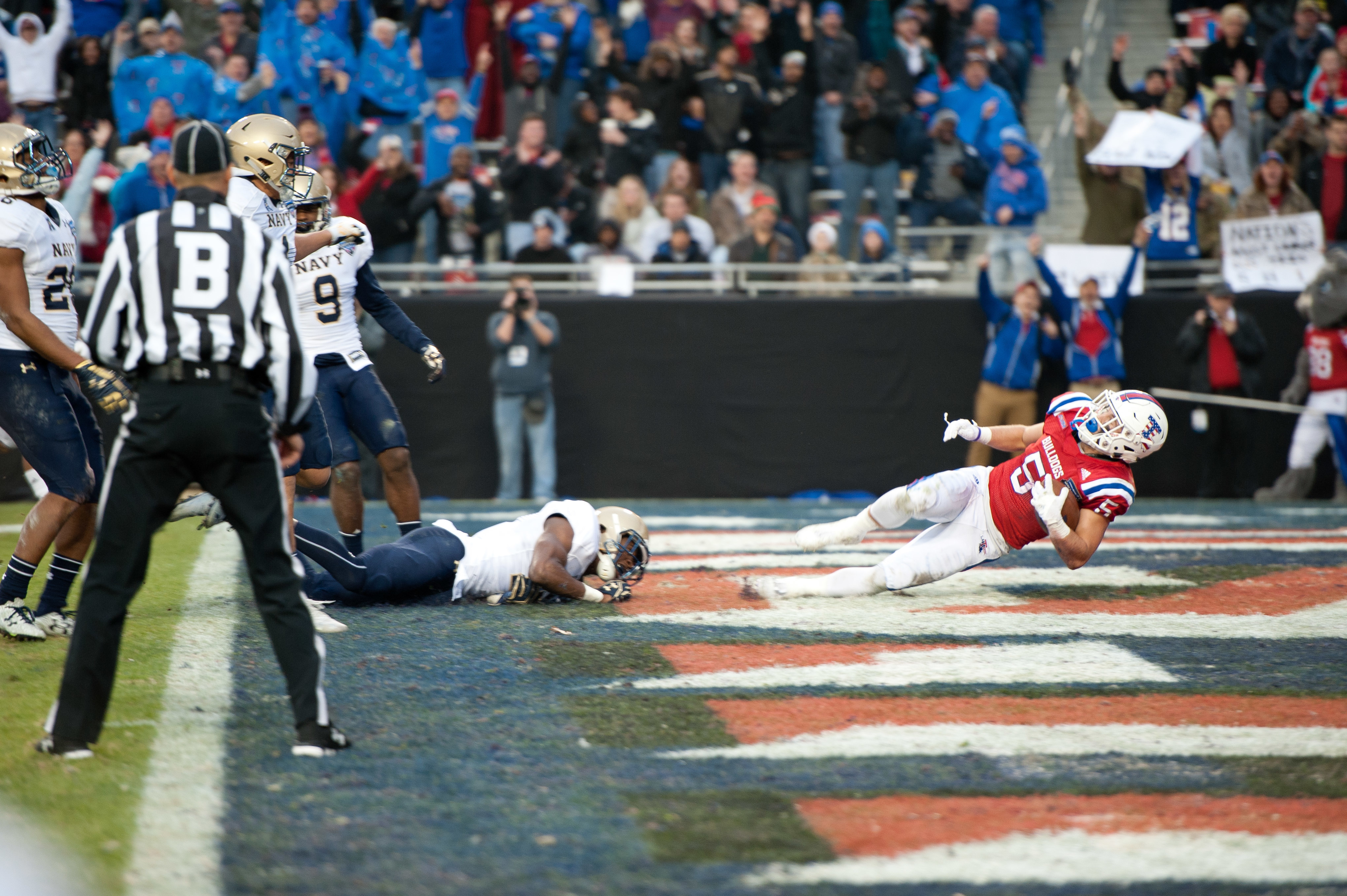
Taylor (right) scoring a touchdown for Louisiana Tech in the 2016 Armed Forces Bowl

Taylor attended Louisiana Tech from 2013 to 2016. During his career, Taylor had 327 receptions for 4,179 yards and 32 touchdowns. The 327 receptions were a school record. In his final collegiate game, Taylor was named the MVP of the 2016 Armed Forces Bowl after recording 12 receptions for 233 yards and two touchdowns.

== Professional career ==
Pre-draft measurables
Height	Weight	Arm length	Hand span	Wingspan	40-yard dash	10-yard split	20-yard split	20-yard shuttle	Three-cone drill	Vertical jump	Broad jump	Bench press
5 ft 8 in (1.73 m)	181 lb (82 kg)	28 3/4 in (0.73 m)	8 1/4 in (0.21 m)	5 ft 8 5/8 in (1.74 m)	4.63 s	1.58 s	2.67 s	4.01 s	6.74 s	33.0 in (0.84 m)	9 ft 9 in (2.97 m)	13 reps
All values from NFL Combine

=== San Francisco 49ers (first stint) ===
The San Francisco 49ers selected Taylor in the fifth round (177th overall) of the 2017 NFL draft.

Taylor made his NFL debut in the season-opener against the Carolina Panthers and had an eight-yard reception in the 23–3 loss. Two weeks later against the Los Angeles Rams, he scored his first career touchdown on a three-yard pass from quarterback Brian Hoyer in the fourth quarter of the narrow 41–39 loss. Taylor finished his rookie season with 43 receptions for 430 yards and two touchdowns.

In the 2018 season, Taylor had 26 receptions for 215 yards and a touchdown, which came in Week 5 against the Arizona Cardinals.

On September 20, 2019, Taylor was placed on injured reserve after suffering a setback from offseason foot surgery.

In the first game of 2020 and Taylor's first game since 2018, he caught two passes for seven yards and returned two punts for 21 yards as the 49ers lost 24–20 to the Arizona Cardinals. He was placed on the reserve/COVID-19 list by the 49ers on December 23, 2020, and activated on January 6, 2021. In the 2020 season, Taylor appeared in 12 games and started one, playing on offense and contributed on punt return duties.

=== Cincinnati Bengals ===
On May 17, 2021, Taylor signed with the Cincinnati Bengals. He was waived on August 31, but was re-signed to the practice squad the next day. He finished the regular season with two receptions for 41 yards and 11 returns for 120 yards. On January 29, 2022, Taylor was promoted to the active roster for the AFC Championship Game. He caught a pass from Joe Burrow for a two-point conversion, tying the game at 21 in a game the Bengals went on to win 27–24, securing the Bengals' first Super Bowl appearance since Super Bowl XXIII in 1988.

On February 22, 2022, Taylor re-signed with the Bengals. He began the 2022 season as the Bengals' primary punt returner along with being the team's backup slot receiver to starter Tyler Boyd. On the season, Taylor returned 33 punts for 340 total yards.

Taylor re-signed with the Bengals on one-year contract on March 27, 2023. He was released during final roster cuts August 29.

=== Chicago Bears ===
Taylor signed with the Chicago Bears on August 31, 2023. He played in all 17 games for Chicago, recording two targets and no receptions while working primarily as a punt returner (in which he logged 8.2 yards per return).

=== San Francisco 49ers (second stint) ===
On April 16, 2024, Taylor signed a one-year contract to return to the San Francisco 49ers. He was released on August 27, but was re-signed to the practice squad the next day.

Taylor signed a reserve/future contract with San Francisco on January 6, 2025. On June 3, the 49ers placed Taylor on injured reserve, ruling him out for the season.

=== Retirement ===
On July 11, 2026, Taylor announced his retirement on his personal social media.

== Career statistics ==
Legend
**Bold**	Career high

=== NFL ===
==== Regular season ====
Year	Team	Games		Receiving					Rushing					Kick returns					Punt returns					Fumbles	
Year	Team	GP	GS	Rec	Yds	Avg	Lng	TD	Att	Yds	Avg	Lng	TD	Ret	Yds	Avg	Lng	TD	Ret	Yds	Avg	Lng	TD	Fum	Lost
2017	SF	15	1	**43**	**430**	10.0	33	**2**	–	–	–	–	–	1	18	**18.0**	8	0	30	281	9.4	**39**	0	1	1
2018	SF	14	0	26	215	8.3	23	1	–	–	–	–	–	1	15	15.0	15	0	10	78	7.8	18	0	1	0
2020	SF	12	1	10	86	8.6	29	0	–	–	–	–	–	–	–	–	–	–	9	112	**12.4**	20	0	0	0
2021	CIN	4	0	2	41	**20.5**	26	0	–	–	–	–	–	**4**	**68**	17.0	**25**	0	7	52	7.4	12	0	0	0
2022	CIN	16	1	6	62	10.3	**34**	0	**4**	**15**	**3.8**	**9**	0	2	15	7.5	9	0	**33**	**340**	10.3	27	0	**2**	**2**
2023	CHI	17	0	0	0	0.0	0	0	1	−2	−2.0	−2	0	–	–	–	–	–	23	188	8.2	31	0	**2**	1
Career		78	3	87	834	9.6	34	3	5	13	2.6	9	0	8	106	13.3	25	0	112	1,051	9.4	39	0	10	4

==== Postseason ====
Year	Team	Games		Kick returns					Punt returns					Fumbles	
Year	Team	GP	GS	Ret	Yds	Avg	Lng	TD	Ret	Yds	Avg	Lng	TD	Fum	Lost
2021	CIN	4	0	–	–	–	–	–	**6**	**76**	**12.7**	**20**	0	0	0
2022	CIN	3	0	**1**	**18**	**18.0**	**18**	0	5	39	7.8	14	0	**1**	**1**
Career		7	0	1	18	18.0	18	0	11	115	10.5	20	0	1	1

=== College ===
Legend
Led NCAA Division I FBS

Season	Games		Receiving				Punt returns			
Season	GP	GS	Rec	Yards	Avg	TD	Att	Yards	Avg	TD
2013	12	0	28	260	9.3	2	6	53	8.8	0
2014	14	9	64	834	13.0	9	**22**	168	7.6	0
2015	13	12	99	1,282	12.9	9	13	83	6.4	0
2016	14	14	**136**	**1,803**	**13.3**	**12**	17	**178**	**10.5**	0
Career	53	35	327	4,179	12.8	32	58	482	8.3	0
