= Heart of Dallas Classic =

- Stadium: Cotton Bowl
- Location: Fair Park, Dallas, Texas
- Operated: 2013

2013 matchup
- Army vs. Louisiana Tech (September 28, 2013)

The Heart of Dallas Classic was a planned annual college football game played on the opening weekend of the State Fair of Texas at the historic Cotton Bowl in Fair Park, Dallas, Texas. However, the game was not renewed beyond its initial contest.

== Game results ==
Date	Winning team		Losing team		Attendance
September 28, 2013	**Army Black Knights**	**35**	Louisiana Tech Bulldogs	16	31,278

Winner listed in bold.
