= Cole Digges =

Cole Digges may refer to:

- Cole Digges (burgess) (1691–1744), Virginia merchant, planter and politician
- Cole Digges (patriot) (1748–1788), Virginia planter, military officer and politician
