= Cole Taylor =

Pornographic actor

Cole Taylor was a pornographic actor who primarily worked in gay adult film in the 1980s. He debuted in 1984, delivered a notable performance in a bisexual film, and starred in what may be gay adult film's first safe sex film in 1985. He died in 1989.

He made his debut in the Nova Studios production Heroes (1984). His acting debut was inauspicious. One reviewer for Manshots magazine noted, "...Taylor was certainly cute, but he lacked the look or sound of mature authority needed to play the role of a teacher convincingly. That was however, the role assigned him by [the director]." "...Taylor's line readings sounded so frothily coy and cheerful, you'd have thought he'd studied with Billie Burke. Miscasting, then had sabotaged a key part of the old Nova formula: That nothing in a man's looks, environment, or voice should seem stereotypically gay."

Despite this performance, Taylor continued to perform in adult film. He turned in only two more notable performances, in Full Grown, Full Blown, and the bisexual production Cross Over. Although his performance may not have been notable, another of his films was. Lifeguard, an original performance produced in 1985 by HIS Video, may be the first safe sex gay adult film ever made. In between scenes, Robert Bolan, president of the San Francisco AIDS Foundation, discussed safe sex practices. Gay adult film historian Jeffrey Escoffier notes that the film showcased some of the most popular performers of the day, which included Taylor. By the end of his career, Cole Taylor made about 25 pornographic films.

According to adult film historian Rex Hardesty, Taylor died in 1989. Hardesty did not disclose the cause of death. According to the industry publication Adam Film World, Taylor was bisexual.

== Bibliography ==
- Adam Film World. 1991 Directory of Gay Adult Videos. Los Angeles, Calif.: 1990.
- Adam Film World. 1992 Directory of Gay Adult Videos. Los Angeles, Calif.: 1991.
- Atkol Video. Atkol Comprehensive Guide to Adult Male Videos. Plainfield, N.J.: Atkol, 1990.
- Burger, John R. One-Handed Histories: The Eroto-Politics of Gay Male Video Pornography. New York: Haworth Press, 1995.
- Escoffier, Jeffrey. Bigger Than Life: The History of Gay Porn Cinema From Beefcake to Hardcore. Philadelphia, Pa.: Running Press, 2009.
- Hardesty, Rex. "Nova Studios, Part Two: The Final Years." Manshots. August 1997.
- Wayne, Bruce. Gay Porn Star Directory. Laguna Hills, Calif.: Companion Press, 2000.
