= Cole Miller (activist) =

American peace activist and radio producer

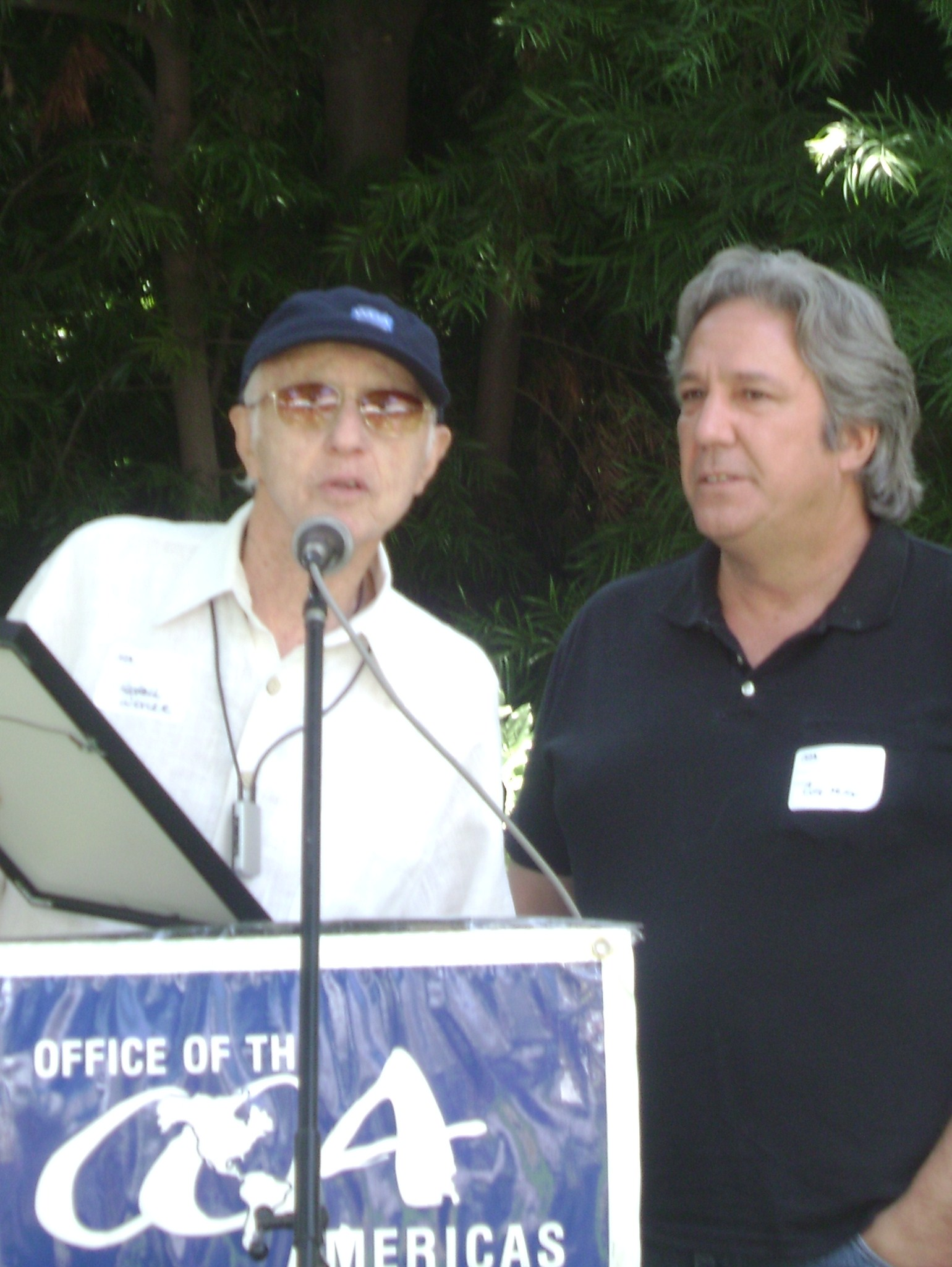
Cole Miller, pictured here with Haskell Wexler, receives Lottie Wexler Award for Peace and Justice from the Office of the Americas, 2008

Mayne Cole Miller (born December 4, 1956, in Johnson City, Tennessee) is an American peace activist and radio producer.

He is the Founding Director of No More Victims, a non-profit organization which pairs war-injured Iraqi children with communities across the United States in an effort to advocate and educate for peace. Because of this, Miller has appeared in People magazine’s “Heroes Among Us” section, and been featured representing No More Victims in national and international media, including two appearances on Democracy Now! with Amy Goodman. Miller has also been a guest on numerous radio programs including Antiwar Radio with Scott Horton and World Focus with Blase Bonpane.

He was the co-creator, producer and senior writer/editor of Isla Earth, an environmentally focused radio series, produced by the Catalina Island Conservancy. The radio series won the 2008 Los Angeles Times News Bureau category award.

Miller is the grandson of Gwendolyn and Hidenari Terasaki, a Japanese diplomat, who were the subject of the 1961 film, Bridge to the Sun, based on Gwen Terasaki's autobiography of the same name. Miller's mother, Mariko Terasaki Miller, was the first woman appointed Honorary Consul-General of Japan.

Miller currently resides in Casper, Wyoming, with his wife, Ann, and continues his work on issues involving peace, justice and human rights.
