= Cole Tucker (disambiguation) =

Cole Tucker may refer to:

- Cole Tucker (born 1996), American baseball player
- Cole Tucker (actor) (1953–2015), American actor
- Cole Tucker (Canadian football) (born 1999), American player of Canadian football
