= Cole Sternberg =

American visual artist

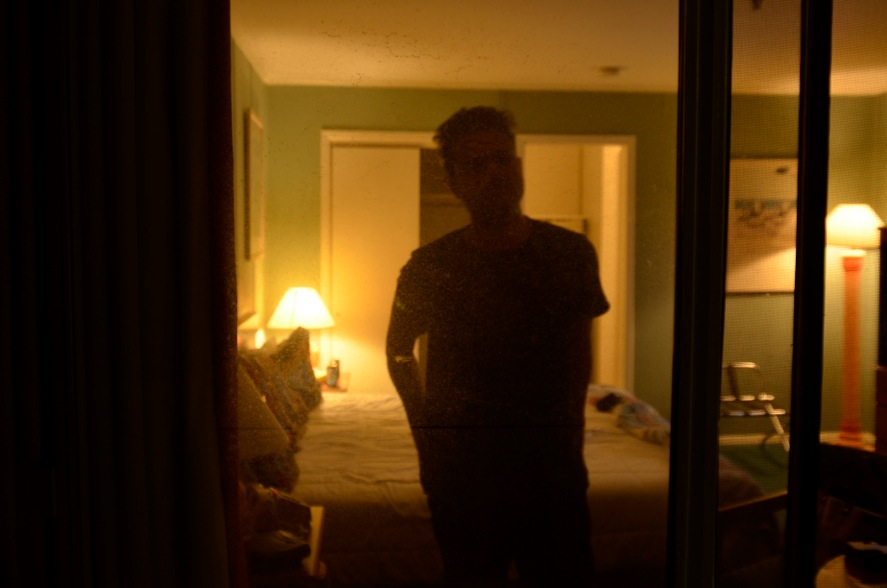
- Cole Sternberg, Sag Harbor, July 2013
- Born: Cole Andrew Sternberg; Richmond, Virginia
- Website: http://www.colesternberg.com/

Cole Sternberg is an American visual artist based in California. His work includes painting, photography, sculpture, installation, film, and writing, and addresses environmental and political subjects.

== Early life ==
Sternberg was born in Richmond, Virginia. He studied business at Villanova University and earned a Juris Doctor from American University.

While attending law school, Sternberg held an early solo exhibition in a Washington, D.C., bar and gallery. His studies included international human rights, a subject he later addressed in his artwork.

== Career ==
Sternberg’s early paintings combined text with watercolor, oil paint, and spray paint. Words were frequently obscured by layers of paint. In interviews, he connected this use of text and erasure to censorship and misinformation.

In 2009, the American University Museum in Washington, D.C., presented Sternberg’s solo exhibition and those who were dancing were thought to be insane by those who could not hear the music. Sternberg described the exhibition as addressing war and human rights, drawing on his legal studies. Sternberg participated in Home at the El Segundo Museum of Art in 2014–2015. His contributions included three altered photographic posters depicting home-protection techniques and a backpack made of aluminum and concrete.

His later work incorporates environmental processes into painting. He has dragged works through oceans and lakes, suspended them in trees, and exposed them to snow, wind, and sunlight, allowing these conditions to alter their surfaces.

In 2015, Sternberg traveled across the Pacific aboard a commercial shipping vessel. During the 22-day journey from Japan to Portland, Oregon, he produced paintings, photographs, and film footage. He exposed paintings to storms on deck and dragged others alongside the vessel.

His project The Free Republic of California proposes an independent California through artworks, legal documents, national symbols, and policy proposals. It was presented in FREESTATE at the El Segundo Museum of Art from October 2020 to September 2021. The exhibition combined a proposed constitution and budget with flags, images, objects, and music.

From November 2022 to January 2023, Villanova University presented Sternberg’s exhibition thirsty while drowning. It included 15 paintings altered through exposure to wind, rain, and bodies of water, alongside photographic murals installed across several campus buildings. The murals incorporated images taken during his Pacific voyage.

Sternberg has also produced generative digital art. His Art Blocks projects include the spring begins with the first rainstorm (2022) and chaos comes with the summer haze (2023). Sternberg collaborated with Giga, a joint initiative of UNICEF and the International Telecommunication Union, on a garden, a generative art project that uses school connectivity data to produce evolving digital imagery. The artwork changes in appearance and color to reflect stages of internet connectivity at participating schools. Giga presented the project at Paris Photo at the Grand Palais in November 2025.

In 2025, the Museum of Contemporary Art Santa Barbara presented the wind is heavy which blows between a horse’s ears, an installation extending Sternberg’s The Free Republic of California project. Combining an image of a horse with text, the work inaugurated the museum’s Facade Project and was installed on its glass entrance doors and at its Chapala Street storefront storage space.

In June 2026, Los Angeles Nomadic Division (LAND) presented Sternberg’s along the high embankments, a site-specific installation in a concrete bunker at Presqu’ile Winery in Santa Maria, California. Sternberg was the inaugural artist-in-residence for the collaboration. The paintings were made using environmental processes, including painting canvases in the soil, suspending them in the wind, and pulling them through the Pacific Ocean. Some retained traces of soil and grass. Reviewing the exhibition for The Unibrow, Evan Pricco emphasized the relationship between the artworks and the bunker’s architecture, describing how wind, light, and the building’s openings connected the installation to its surrounding landscape.

== Collections ==
Sternberg’s work is held in the collections of the Los Angeles County Museum of Art, Pérez Art Museum Miami, American University Museum, and Museum of Old and New Art. LACMA holds a wave in four parts (2015), made with watercolor, acrylic, and saltwater on linen.

== Selected Exhibitions ==
=== 2026 ===
- along the high embankments, Los Angeles Nomadic Division (LAND) at Presqu’ile Winery, Santa Maria, California.
- Peace, ESMoA, Lawndale, California.

=== 2025 ===
- Phallus :: Fascinum :: Fascism, The Box, Los Angeles, California, 2025–2026.
- the wind is heavy which blows between a horse’s ears, Museum of Contemporary Art Santa Barbara, Santa Barbara, CA

=== 2023 ===
- a forest of thoughts in quick succession, Praz Delavallade, Los Angeles, CA
- Storage Wars, The Hole, Los Angeles
- We Are They: Glitch Ecology and the Thickness of Now, Honor Fraser, Los Angeles, CA
- (Probably) All in the Mind, Verse, London, U.K.
- For Zoe Leonard: A Performance, Museum of Contemporary Art Santa Barbara (MCASB), Santa Barbara, CA

=== 2022 ===
- departed for the curve, Praz Delavallade, Los Angeles, CA
- to join the larger raindrop of the ocean, Yeo Workshop, Singapore
- thirsty while drowning, Villanova University Art Gallery and campus, Villanova, Pennsylvania
- The Medium is the Message, Wende Museum, Culver City, CA
- The California Monuments Consortium Lab, Carolyn Glasoe Bailey Foundation, in collaboration with LAND and ESMoA, Ojai
- Storm Before the Calm, Praz Delavallade, Los Angeles

=== 2021 ===
- Threads and Tensions: The Interconnected World, Yeo Workshop, Singapore
- Freestate, El Segundo Museum of Art (ESMoA), El Segundo, CA

=== 2020 ===
- Show Me the Signs, Blum & Poe, Los Angeles, CA
- Year One, Ojai Institute, Ojai, CA
- owls stirred the silence here and there, Pluto Projects, Los Angeles, CA

=== 2019 ===
- The Edge of Light, Huntington Beach Art Center, Huntington Beach, CA
- Smoke & Mirrors, AF Projects, Los Angeles, CA
- the blue water was only a heavier and darker air, Peter Blake Gallery, Laguna Beach, CA
- the trees turned to shadows in a grey fog, There-There, Los Angeles, CA

=== 2018 ===
- A Matter of Course, The Guggenheim Gallery at Chapman University, Orange, CA
- As You Like It - C’est Comme Vous Voulez, Praz Delavallade, Los Angeles, CA

=== 2017 ===
- the windward side of the island, MAMA, Berlin, Germany
- elsegundissimo, El Segundo Museum of Art, El Segundo, CA

=== 2016 ===
- for a moment the concrete felt soft and warm, AiOP, New York, NY
- for a moment, it scraped, then cooled, the feet, LAXART, Los Angeles, CA
- Rob Pruitt's Flea Market, Los Angeles Nomadic Division (LAND), Los Angeles, CA
- the nature of breathing in salt, MAMA, Los Angeles, CA

=== 2015 ===
- are the green fields gone, the high seas
- a moment near the sea, MAMA + ARTed House, East Hampton, NY

=== 2014 ===
- Erection, MAMA, Los Angeles, CA
- International Friendship Exhibition, Primary, Miami, FL
- Home, El Segundo Museum of Art, El Segundo, CA

=== 2013 ===
- Art Works, e105 Gallery, Berlin, Germany
- a moment in the sun, ARTed House, Wainscott, NY
- all his strength was concentrated in his fists, including the very strength that held him upright, David B. Smith Gallery, Denver, CO

=== 2012 ===
- you'll miss your riding lesson tomorrow, Primary Projects, Caruso Art and Flaunt Magazine, Miami, FL
- Perpetual Conceptual: Echoes of Eugenia Butler, Los Angeles Nomadic Division (LAND), Los Angeles, CA
- All in for the 99%, Ace Museum, Los Angeles, CA
- Salon de Notre Societe, Primary Projects, Miami, FL
- Permanent Collection Group Exhibition, Deutsche Telekom (Detecon), Cologne, Germany
- Group Exhibition, David B. Smith Gallery, Denver, CO

=== 2011 ===
- Here Lies Georges Wildenstein, Primary Projects, Miami, FL
- I was here for just a moment, David B. Smith Gallery, Denver, CO

=== 2010 ===
- One on One, Hochhaus Hansa (a Ruhr.2010 Museum), Dortmund, Germany
- 100 Artists See Satan, Grand Central Arts Center, Cal State Fullerton, Santa Ana, CA
- Group Exhibition, David B. Smith Gallery, Denver, CO
- Transparenz, Detecon (presented by e105 Gallery), Bonn, Germany

=== 2009 ===
- and those who were dancing were thought to be insane by those who could not hear the music, American University Museum, Washington, DC
- New Works, Kinsey/DesForges, Culver City, CA

== Publications ==
- the constitution, The Free Republic of California, 2021.
- Muir, John. My First Summer in the Sierra. Imagery and design by Cole Sternberg; introduction by Percival Everett. Hat & Beard Press, 2020.
- the nature of breathing in salt, Hat & Beard Press, 2019.
- the windward side of the island, MAMA, 2017.
- for a moment it scraped then cooled the skin, LAXART, 2016.
- all his strength was concentrated in his fists, including the very strength that held him upright, 2013.
- And those who were dancing were thought to be insane by those who could not hear the music, 2010, Western Canon.
- Cole Sternberg Paintings, Western Canon, 2008.
