= Cole Sax =

American film director

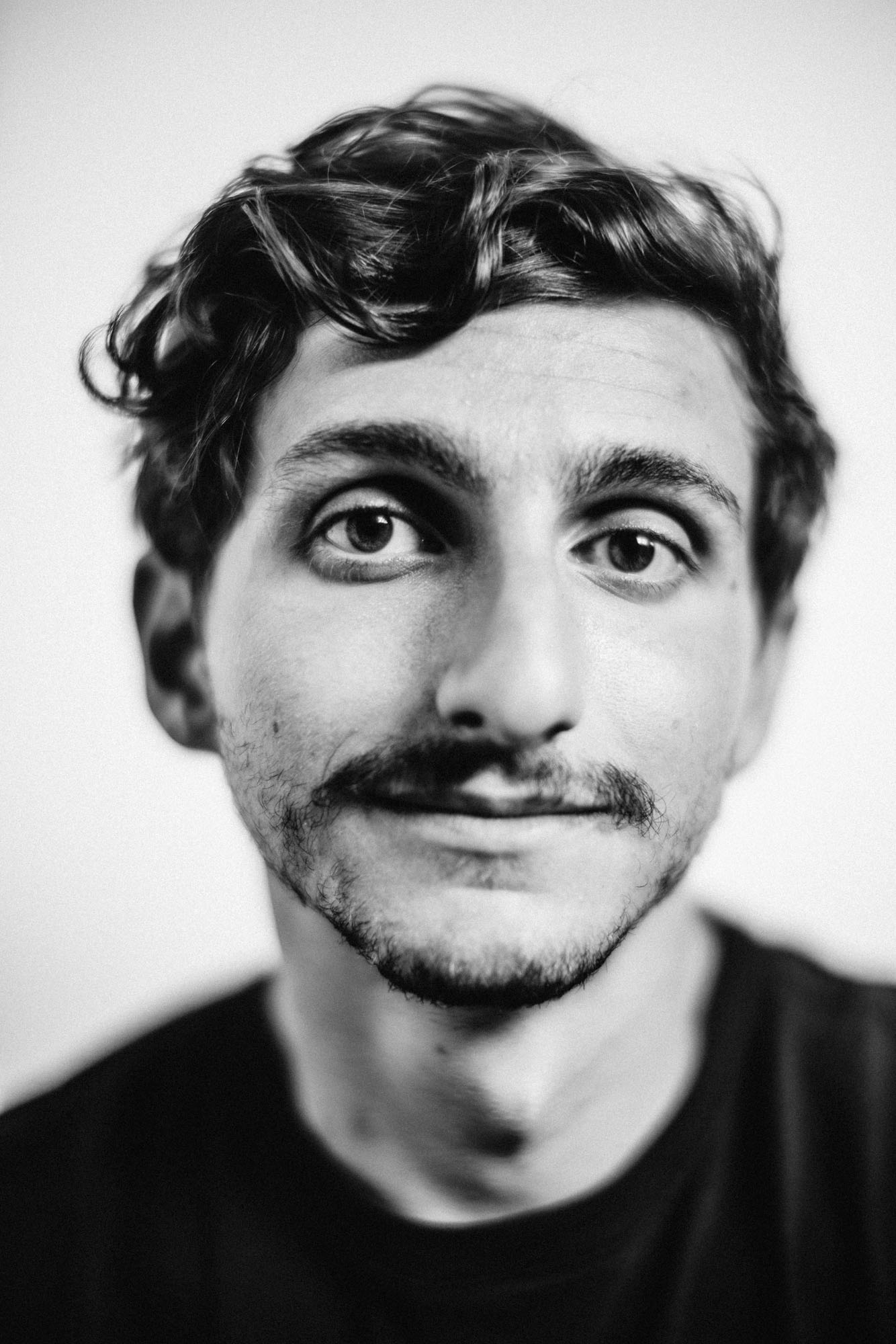
- Born: Atlanta, Georgia, United States
- Occupations: Film director and producer
- Notable work: World Debut and Dear Class of 2020

Cole Sax is an American film director and producer. He has directed films such as World Debut, a sports documentary about how the skateboarding, surfing, and climbing subcultures eventually made their way to the Olympics.

Sax's 2018 documentary series Far From Home, produced for the Olympic Channel and Snapchat, won three Telly Awards, including Gold in video web-series. Additionally, his short documentary film Second Sight won the Norman Vaughan Indomitable Spirit Award at the Mountainfilm festival, and also a silver for directing at the Telly Awards.

== Early life and education ==
Sax was born and raised in Atlanta, Georgia, but started his filmmaking education at a young age when he moved to Park City, Utah. He attended Park City Academy and graduated from Park City High School, then went on to study film at the University of Utah.

== Career ==
Sax began his career when he was 16 while working for InSync Plus, a motion picture company in Los Angeles. When he was 18, he won his first Clio Key Art Award for the TV spot he edited for the feature film, The Art of Getting By. A short documentary film that he created in high school, 88 and Sunny, screened at the Metropolitan Pavilion red-carpet gala for the 10th anniversary of the September 11 attacks.

Sax has directed films in various parts of the world, including Malaysia, India, the Philippines, and Argentina. He has produced documentaries and content for the Nike and Facebook. Sax has also received the Mountainfilm Spirit Award for his documentary work.

Together with Boardwalk Pictures, Sax directed and produced the 2018 documentary series Far From Home, which features athletes trying to get to the Olympic Games. Additionally, Sax has conducted filmmaking workshops at U.S. embassies in various countries. He has also worked together with organizations such as the Obama Foundation and Khan Academy to produce documentaries such as Dear Class of 2020, a 2020 YouTube Originals film that has been nominated for the Emmy Awards.

In 2021, Sax co-directed the feature-length documentary film World Debut for YouTube Originals, which documents skateboarders, surfers, and climbers as the sports are added to competition in the Olympic Games.

== Personal life ==
Sax is based in both Salt Lake City, Utah and Los Angeles, California.

== Awards and honors ==
Cole Sax's awards include:

Year	Award	Title	Result
2020	The Non-Fiction Cartel (Best Short)	Second Sight	Won
2020	Norman Vaughan Indomitable Spirit Award	Second Sight	Won
2020	Silver Telly (Directing)	Second Sight	Won
2020	Silver Telly (Documentary)	Second Sight	Won
2018	Gold Telly (Webseries: Documentary)	Far from Home	Won
2018	Silver Telly (Webseries: Series)	Far from Home	Won
2018	Silver Telly (Webseries: Non-scripted)	Far from Home	Won

== Filmography ==
Cole Sax's filmography:

Year	Title	Type	Credits
2021	World Debut	documentary	director; creative director; executive producer
2020	Dear Class of 2020	video	segment director; creative director; executive producer
2019	Second Sight	documentary short	director; executive producer / producer
2019	North Country	short	story producer
2018	Far From Home	TV documentary series	director; executive producer; co-editor
2018	In Searching		second unit cinematographer
2017	Forward: Women's March on Washington	short	director; producer; editor; writer
2014	Far from Home: Uganda to the Tetons	documentary	additional camera
2011	88 and Sunny	video short	director; producer; editor; writer; cinematographer
