= Cole Smith =

Cole Smith may refer to:

- Cole Smith (ice hockey) (born 1995), an American professional ice hockey player
- Cole Smith (fighter) (born 1989), a Canadian professional mixed martial artist and former boxer
