= Cole Turner =

Cole Turner may refer to:

- Cole Turner (American football) (born 2000), American football player
- Cole Turner (soccer) (born 2001), American soccer player
- Cole Turner (Charmed), fictional character in the American TV series Charmed
