= Cole Gardner =

American football player (born 1993)

Profile
- Position: Offensive tackle

Personal information
- Born: November 11, 1993 (age 32); Batavia, Illinois
- Listed height: 6 ft 6 in (1.98 m)
- Listed weight: 302 lb (137 kg)

Career information
- High school: Batavia (IL)
- College: Eastern Michigan
- NFL draft: 2017: undrafted

Career history
- Tampa Bay Buccaneers (2017–2018)*; Orlando Apollos (2019)*
- * Offseason or practice squad member only
- Stats at Pro Football Reference

Cole Gardner (born November 11, 1993) is an American football offensive tackle who is currently a free agent. He played college football at Eastern Michigan.

== Professional career ==
Gardner signed with the Tampa Bay Buccaneers as an undrafted free agent on May 1, 2017. He was waived/injured on August 19, 2017, and was placed on injured reserve.

On September 1, 2018, Gardner was waived/injured by the Buccaneers and was placed on injured reserve. He was released on October 12, 2018.
