= Brady Poppinga =

American football player (born 1979)

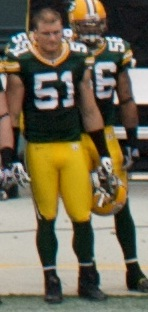
- Poppinga with the Green Bay Packers in 2008

No. 51, 98
- Position: Linebacker

Personal information
- Born: September 21, 1979 (age 47); Evanston, Wyoming, U.S.
- Listed height: 6 ft 3 in (1.91 m)
- Listed weight: 252 lb (114 kg)

Career information
- High school: Evanston
- College: BYU
- NFL draft: 2005: 4th round, 125th overall pick

Career history
- Green Bay Packers (2005–2010); St. Louis Rams (2011); Dallas Cowboys (2012)

Awards and highlights
- Super Bowl champion (XLV); 3× First-team All-MW (2002, 2003, 2004)

Career NFL statistics
- Total tackles: 308
- Sacks: 5.0
- Forced fumbles: 3
- Fumble recoveries: 2
- Interceptions: 2
- Stats at Pro Football Reference

Brady Paul Poppinga (born September 21, 1979) is an American former professional football player who was a linebacker in the National Football League (NFL). He played college football for the BYU Cougars. Poppinga played in the NFL for the Green Bay Packers, St. Louis Rams, and Dallas Cowboys. With the Packers, he won Super Bowl XLV over the Pittsburgh Steelers.

== Early life ==
Poppinga attended Evanston High School in Evanston, Wyoming. He lettered three years in football and basketball, and four years in track. In football, he was an All-State selection at both linebacker and tight end. He was named both 4-A lineman and Wyoming Athlete of the Year as a senior while leading the team to a 9–1 record and a 4-A state title. In 1995, he earned the rank of Eagle Scout. He also finished second in a 1997 high school discus competition.

== College career ==
After graduating from high school, Poppinga served a two-year mission for the Church of Jesus Christ of Latter-day Saints (LDS Church) in Uruguay and enrolled at Brigham Young University in 2001. Poppinga quickly earned a place on the Cougar roster. He played in all 12 games of the 2001 season at defensive end, recording 10 tackles, a fumble recovery, and one pass defended on the season. Poppinga also made a significant contribution on special teams.

Poppinga's performance as a freshman gave him even more playing time in the 2002 season, including two starts and playing time in all 12 contests. He responded with a conference-leading eight sacks, and was named to the first-team All-MWC and as an MWC All-Academic selection. Poppinga also forced three fumbles and had three quarterback pressures on the season. He was also given an award as BYU's top defensive lineman.

He started all 12 contests at defensive end in the 2003 season. He led the team and finished seventh in the conference in sacks with six and was among the top players in the conference in tackles with 55 (34 solo) and once again earned All-MWC honors. One of his most notable games of the season was a September 6 contest against the Trojans of USC, in which he earned co-defensive player of the game honors for a six-tackle performance that included five solo tackles and a sack of star USC quarterback Matt Leinart.

In 2004, Poppinga started every game of his senior season, shifting near the end of the season from defensive end to outside linebacker. He finished third on the team in tackles with 79 (35 solo), also accumulating six sacks and one forced fumble, and for the third time in his career was selected for first-team All-MWC honors. Poppinga was also a candidate among 58 others for the Bronko Nagurski Trophy for the nation's top defensive player. He was named defensive player of the game for a September 4 contest against Notre Dame in which he posted 12 tackles (seven solo), a sack, a forced fumble and a fumble recovery.

== Professional career ==
Pre-draft measurables
Height	Weight	Arm length	Hand span	40-yard dash	10-yard split	20-yard split	20-yard shuttle	Three-cone drill	Vertical jump	Broad jump	Bench press	Wonderlic
6 ft 3 1/8 in (1.91 m)	259 lb (117 kg)	31 1/8 in (0.79 m)	9 1/4 in (0.23 m)	4.72 s	1.65 s	2.70 s	4.38 s	7.27 s	35.5 in (0.90 m)	9 ft 2 in (2.79 m)	26 reps	25
All values from NFL Combine

=== Green Bay Packers ===
Poppinga entered the NFL on April 24, 2005, when he was selected in the fourth round (125th overall selection) of the 2005 draft by the Green Bay Packers. On July 26, 2005, Poppinga signed a four-year $2.4 million contract with the Packers.

The Packers were excited about Poppinga's speed and skills as a pass rushing linebacker. However, Poppinga suffered a hamstring injury during training camp, forcing him to miss three preseason games. Because of the injury, he was unable to compete for a starting position at outside linebacker in the 2005 season, and took a backup role, occasionally playing as part of a deep linebacker corps also featuring Na'il Diggs, Roy Manning, Robert Thomas, and Paris Lenon.

Poppinga contributed most significantly to the 2005 season with his high-energy play as a coverage man on special teams plays, posting a team-high 22 special teams tackles through the Packers' first 13 contests. Though Poppinga never started at linebacker in 2005, he saw more and more playing time through the season due both to injuries suffered by the starting players and because of his ability as a pass-rusher. This special pass-rushing role played to Poppinga's strengths and allowed him to post two sacks during the 2005 season. His best single-game performance was an October 23 contest against the Minnesota Vikings, in which he accumulated five tackles (3 solo) and one sack of Vikings quarterback Daunte Culpepper.

Green Bay's coaching staff was impressed by Poppinga's high motor and relentlessness on every play. He displayed both in one of the few Packer victories of the season, a 33–25 contest against the Atlanta Falcons. Though the play resulted in an Atlanta touchdown, Poppinga displayed his range and quickness by nearly running down superstar quarterback Michael Vick on a one-yard scramble into the end-zone. Poppinga's pursuit forced Vick to stretch the play all the way to the right sideline, and only Vick's speed allowed him to dive past Poppinga and over the end zone pylon. The fact that Poppinga had begun the play at the left side of the formation displayed his unrelenting attitude and sharp instincts. In August 2006 packers' linebackers coach Winston Moss said "I'll bet he sleeps with his eyes open", referring to Poppinga's endless energy.

Poppinga's season was cut short by an ACL tear on December 11 in a game against the Detroit Lions. He received surgery for the injury on December 26, and participated in the August 2006 training camp. Though some athletes who suffer this particular injury never regain their former speed or mobility, doctors who performed surgery on Poppinga and those working on his rehabilitation were optimistic about his chances for a full recovery.

Poppinga won a starting job despite limited action in training camp due to his continuing rehabilitation from injury in 2006. He played at strong side linebacker in the 2006 season opener, alongside fellow linebackers Nick Barnett and A. J. Hawk.

In his fifth start of the 2007 season, during a 27–20 loss to the Chicago Bears on October 7, 2007, Poppinga intercepted a Brian Griese pass in the fourth quarter, extending the streak of at least one Packer interception per game for the 11th consecutive game. This matched the longest streak in team history, which occurred during an 11-game stretch in 1984–1985.

On July 24, 2008, the Packers signed Poppinga to a five-year $17 million extension that ran through the 2012 season. Poppinga was scheduled to make $927,000 in 2008 under the terms of the four-year deal he signed in 2005. According to his agent, four years were added beyond this year.

In 2008, Poppinga played all 16 games with 12 starts and recorded 68 tackles. He was released on July 28, 2011.

=== St. Louis Rams ===
On August 2, 2011, Poppinga signed with the St. Louis Rams. He wasn't re-signed after the season.

=== Dallas Cowboys ===
On November 25, 2012, Poppinga was signed by the Dallas Cowboys to replace an injured Bruce Carter. He was not re-signed after the season.

== NFL career statistics ==
Year	Team	GP	Comb	Ast	Sacks	Int	Yds	Avg	Lng	TD	PD	FF	FR
2005	GB	12	28	5	2	0	0	0	0	0	0	0	0
2006	GB	16	60	16	1	1	21	21.0	21	0	4	2	0
2007	GB	16	50	28	0	1	0	0	0	0	1	0	0
2008	GB	16	69	21	0	0	0	0	0	0	1	0	0
2009	GB	15	23	7	1	0	0	0	0	0	0	0	0
2010	GB	6	14	7	1	0	0	0	0	0	0	0	0
2011	STL	15	51	14	0	0	0	0	0	0	2	1	0
2012	DAL	4	12	5	0	0	0	0	0	0	1	0	0
Total		100	307	82	5	2	21	10.5	21	0	9	3	0

== Broadcasting career ==
Poppinga currently works as an NFL sideline reporter and analyst for Fox Deportes, utilizing his fluency in Spanish. In February 2014, he was a part of the team providing commentary for the first U.S. Spanish-language network televised Super Bowl.

== Personal life ==
Poppinga comes from an athletic family. His father, Dennis, played as a tight end at BYU from 1968 to 1971; his brother, Casey, played the same position at Utah State University (USU) and appeared on the practice squads of the Seattle Seahawks, Kansas City Chiefs, and Philadelphia Eagles during the 2004 NFL season; his brother Kelly played linebacker at BYU, signed with the St. Louis Rams, and is now the defensive coordinator at BYU; and his older sister, Tara, played volleyball at USU.

Poppinga received a bachelor's degree in business management at BYU. While in college he did some work as a motivational speaker at a school for troubled teenagers, and taught Sunday School in his LDS Church congregation in Provo, Utah. He is bilingual (English and Spanish) as a result of his missionary service in Uruguay.

He married Brooke Hubbard in 2002; the couple has 3 daughters and a son.

On February 15, 2008, Poppinga appeared with Senator Barack Obama in support of his presidential campaign in Green Bay, Wisconsin.

On August 31, 2023, Poppinga's 17-year-old son Julius died from a severe asthma attack he had suffered a week prior.

== Charity ==
Poppinga was the Packers' 2007 nominee, and one of 32 finalists, for the Walter Payton Man of the Year Award, honoring contributions for both humanitarianism and performance on the field.

Poppinga is extremely involved in the LDS Church. He postponed his college football career for two seasons while serving as a missionary in Uruguay. He currently acts as a youth leader, giving hour-long motivational and moral lessons weekly as well as supporting other youth activities. He has given a devotional on faith, family and football, an event that was open to the entire community.

Poppinga has supported the Boy Scouts of America by way of a public service announcement, for which he recorded both an English and Spanish version. In the same way, he has lent his support to the American Family Insurance Military Cap Campaign by shooting various promos. Poppinga also recorded an intro for one of the units included in the Green Bay Packers Fit Kids program. He was a participant in the All-Pro Dad event, encouraging fathers to become more involved in their children's lives.

Poppinga has hosted a football camp, "The Poppinga Football Experience," in Utah, as well as a charity fundraiser football camp in Wyoming for a Children's Hospital. He has served as an instructor in several other football camps. In addition, he has supported his coach's and teammates' fundraising efforts through participation in Mark Tauscher's Trifecta Foundation Annual Golf Outing, the Brett Favre Fourward Foundation Annual Celebrity Softball Game, the Donald Driver Foundation Dinner, and the Family Services of Northeast Wisconsin Green and Gold Gala, an annual event hosted by Coach Mike McCarthy.

Poppinga has made various monetary donations to the community and beyond. He donated hundreds of dollars' worth of new toys to a local nursery, as well as autographed items to an event that benefited the memorial of a fallen Green Bay Fire Fighter. He donated items to the Los Angeles Fire Department, where his brother-in-law is a fire fighter, as a contribution to a fundraiser that benefited victims of 9/11. Through the Fistula Foundation, he paid for surgeries of two women in Ethiopia, and through the Invisible Children Foundation, he purchased school supplies for students in Uganda. He also supported Amnesty International to assist in the case of someone who was unfairly imprisoned.
