= Florida Atlantic Owls football statistical leaders =

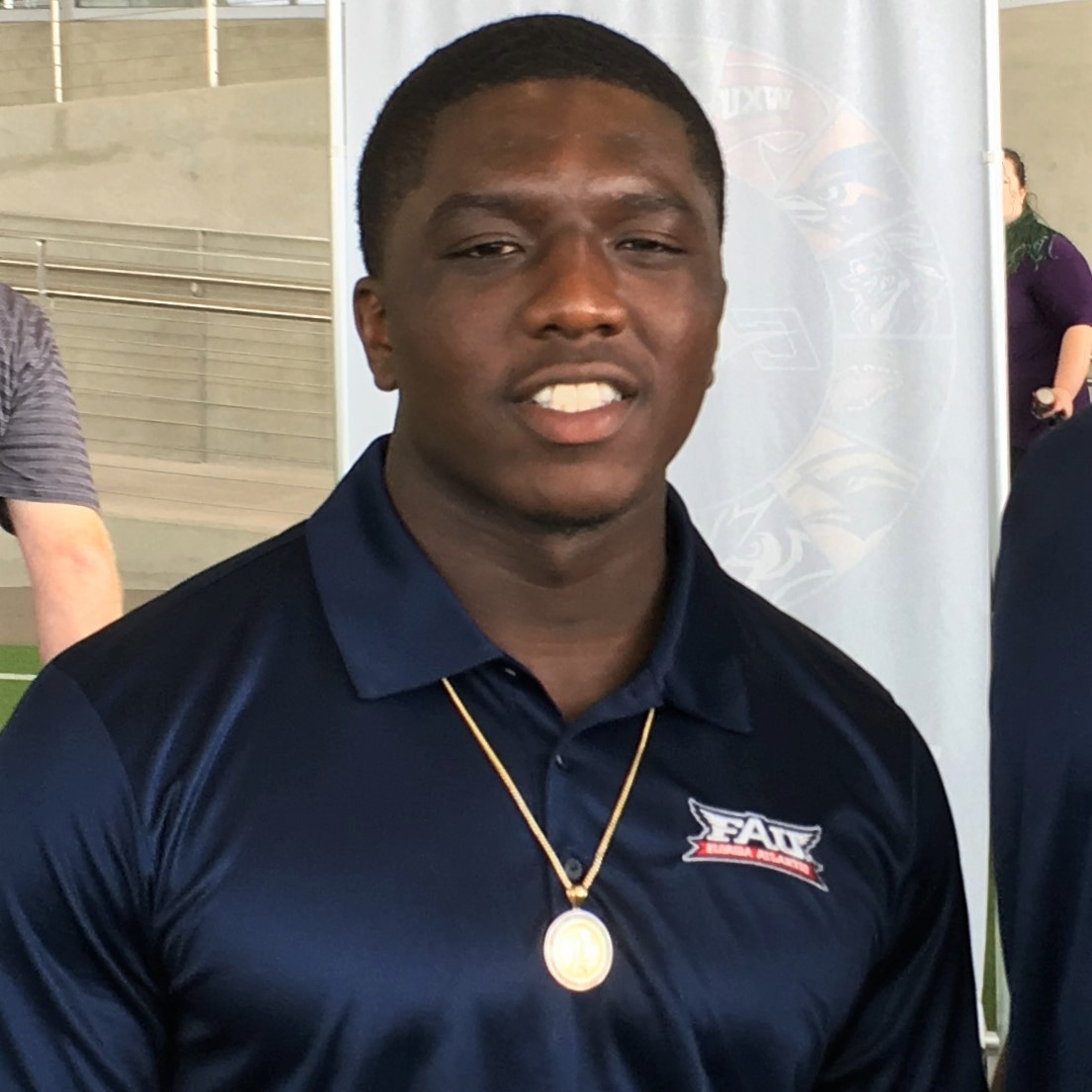
Devin Singletary holds almost all significant FAU rushing and scoring records.

The Florida Atlantic Owls football statistical leaders are individual statistical leaders of the Florida Atlantic Owls football program in various categories, including passing, rushing, receiving, total offense, defensive stats, kicking, and scoring. Within those areas, the lists identify single-game, single-season, and career leaders. The Owls represent Florida Atlantic University in the NCAA Division I FBS American Conference.

Florida Atlantic began competing in intercollegiate football in 2001, so full box scores exist for every game the Owls have ever played. Therefore, unlike most college football teams, FAU's record book is not hampered by unavailability of statistics from games and seasons played decades ago. However, because the program is relatively new, the values on these lists are usually lower than those typically seen on lists like these.

These lists are updated through Week 10 of the 2026 season. Players active for FAU in 2026 are in bold.

== Passing ==
=== Passing yards ===
Career
Rank	Player	Yards	Years
1	Rusty Smith	10,112	2006 2007 2008 2009
2	Jared Allen	8,100	2001 2002 2003 2004
3	**Caden Veltkamp**	6,387	2025 2026
4	Chris Robison	6,234	2018 2019
5	Jaquez Johnson	5,683	2013 2014 2015
6	Jason Driskel	5,627	2015 2016 2017
7	N'Kosi Perry	5,483	2021 2022
8	Graham Wilbert	4,319	2009 2010 2011 2012
9	Jeff Van Camp	3,905	2007 2008 2009 2010
10	Danny Embrick	2,569	2003 2004 2005

Single season
Rank	Player	Yards	Year
1	Chris Robison	3,701	2019
2	Rusty Smith	3,688	2007
3	**Caden Veltkamp**	3,648	2025
4	Rusty Smith	3,224	2008
5	Jared Allen	3,003	2003
6	Graham Wilbert	2,819	2012
7	N'Kosi Perry	2,771	2021
8	**Caden Veltkamp**	2,746	2026
9	N'Kosi Perry	2,712	2022
10	Jared Allen	2,554	2004

Single game
Rank	Player	Yards	Years	Opponent
1	**Caden Veltkamp**	494	2025	UConn
2	Chris Robison	471	2018	Air Force
3	Rusty Smith	463	2007	Minnesota
4	**Caden Veltkamp**	452	2026	North Texas
5	Graham Wilbert	403	2012	FIU

=== Passing touchdowns ===
Career
Rank	Player	TDs	Years
1	Rusty Smith	76	2006 2007 2008 2009
2	**Caden Veltkamp**	51	2025 2026
3	Jared Allen	50	2001 2002 2003 2004
4	N'Kosi Perry	45	2021 2022
5	Chris Robison	40	2018 2019
6	Jaquez Johnson	38	2013 2014 2015
7	Jeff Van Camp	29	2007 2008 2009 2010
8	Jason Driskel	27	2015 2016 2017
9	Graham Wilbert	25	2009 2010 2011 2012
10	Danny Embrick	19	2003 2004 2005

Single season
Rank	Player	TDs	Year
1	Rusty Smith	32	2007
2	Chris Robison	28	2019
3	**Caden Veltkamp**	27	2026
4	N'Kosi Perry	25	2022
5	Jared Allen	24	2003
5	Rusty Smith	24	2008
5	**Caden Veltkamp**	24	2025
8	N'Kosi Perry	20	2021
9	Graham Wilbert	18	2012
10	Jeff Van Camp	17	2010
10	Jaquez Johnson	17	2014

Single game
Rank	Player	TDs	Years	Opponent
1	Rusty Smith	5	2007	Minnesota
1	Rusty Smith	5	2007	Memphis (New Orleans Bowl)
1	Rusty Smith	5	2008	FIU
1	Chris Robison	5	2019	Wagner
1	N'Kosi Perry	5	2022	Ohio
1	Casey Thompson	5	2023	Monmouth
1	Tyriq Starks	5	2024	Tulsa
1	**Caden Veltkamp**	5	2025	Florida A&M
1	**Caden Veltkamp**	5	2026	Navy
1	**Caden Veltkamp**	5	2026	North Texas

== Rushing ==
=== Rushing yards ===
Career
Rank	Player	Yards	Years
1	Devin Singletary	4,289	2016 2017 2018
2	Alfred Morris	3,529	2008 2009 2010 2011
3	Charles Pierre	3,069	2005 2006 2007 2008
4	Gregory Howell	2,369	2014 2015 2016 2017
5	Larry McCammon	2,228	2019 2020 2021 2022 2023
6	Doug Parker	1,981	2001 2003 2004
7	Jaquez Johnson	1,575	2013 2014 2015
8	Jay Warren	1,360	2013 2014 2015
9	Malcolm Davidson	1,317	2018 2019 2020 2021
10	Jonathan Wallace	1,226	2012 2013

Single season
Rank	Player	Yards	Year
1	Devin Singletary	1,920	2017
2	Alfred Morris	1,392	2009
3	Devin Singletary	1,348	2018
4	Alfred Morris	1,186	2011
5	Devin Singletary	1,021	2016
6	Charles Pierre	1,014	2008
7	Larry McCammon	1,004	2022
8	Alfred Morris	928	2010
9	Doug Parker	896	2004

Single game
Rank	Player	Yards	Years	Opponent
1	Devin Singletary	254	2016	Rice
2	Devin Singletary	244	2017	Western Kentucky
3	Devin Singletary	235	2016	Middle Tennessee
4	Devin Singletary	203	2017	Marshall
5	Alfred Morris	198	2011	UAB
6	Charles Pierre	194	2008	Western Kentucky
6	Devin Singletary	194	2017	Old Dominion

=== Rushing touchdowns ===
Career
Rank	Player	TDs	Years
1	Devin Singletary	66	2016 2017 2018
2	Alfred Morris	27	2008 2009 2010 2011
3	Charles Pierre	23	2005 2006 2007 2008
4	Gregory Howell	22	2014 2015 2016 2017
5	Doug Parker	21	2001 2003 2004
6	Larry McCammon	20	2019 2020 2021 2022 2023
7	Jaquez Johnson	19	2013 2014 2015
8	Jason Driskel	13	2015 2016 2017
9	Malcolm Davidson	12	2018 2019 2020 2021
10	Kerrith Whyte	11	2016 2017 2018
10	James Charles	11	2018 2019 2020 2021
10	CJ Campbell Jr.	11	2024

Single season
Rank	Player	TDs	Year
1	Devin Singletary	32	2017
2	Devin Singletary	22	2018
3	Gregory Howell	13	2016
4	Devin Singletary	12	2016
5	Alfred Morris	11	2009
5	CJ Campbell Jr.	11	2024
7	Jaquez Johnson	10	2013
8	Alfred Morris	9	2011
8	Malcolm Davidson	9	2019
10	Doug Parker	8	2001
10	Doug Parker	8	2004
10	Charles Pierre	8	2008
10	Jason Driskel	8	2017
10	Kerrith Whyte Jr.	8	2018

Single game
Rank	Player	TDs	Years	Opponent
1	Devin Singletary	5	2018	Bethune–Cookman
2	Doug Parker	4	2001	Jacksonville
2	Alfred Morris	4	2011	UAB
2	Devin Singletary	4	2017	Middle Tennessee
2	Jason Driskel	4	2017	Old Dominion
2	Devin Singletary	4	2017	Western Kentucky

== Receiving ==
=== Receptions ===
Career
Rank	Player	Rec	Years
1	LaJohntay Wester	252	2020 2021 2022 2023
2	**Easton Messer**	185	2025 2026
3	Cortez Gent	162	2006 2007 2008 2009
4	Harrison Bryant	148	2016 2017 2018 2019
5	Lestar Jean	146	2007 2008 2009 2010
6	Jason Harmon	138	2005 2006 2007 2008
7	Anthony Crissinger-Hill	136	2001 2003 2004
8	Jenson Stoshak	132	2012 2013 2014 2015
9	William Dukes	125	2011 2012 2013 2014
10	Kalib Woods	111	2014 2015 2016

Single season
Rank	Player	Rec	Year
1	LaJohntay Wester	108	2023
2	**Easton Messer**	104	2025
3	**Easton Messer**	81	2026
4	Lucky Whitehead	76	2014
5	Anthony Crissinger-Hill	74	2003
6	Kalib Woods	68	2016
7	Asaad Waseem	66	2025
7	**Kelby Valsin**	66	2026
9	Jovon Durante	65	2018
9	Harrison Bryant	65	2019
9	LaJohntay Wester	65	2021

Single game
Rank	Player	Rec	Years	Opponent
1	**Easton Messer**	16	2026	North Texas
2	Anthony Crissinger-Hill	15	2004	Hawaii
2	**Easton Messer**	15	2025	Maryland
4	LaJohntay Wester	14	2021	Middle Tennessee
4	**Easton Messer**	14	2026	Army
6	LaJohntay Wester	13	2023	Illinois
7	Jovon Durante	12	2018	Air Force
7	LaJohntay Wester	12	2023	Ohio
7	LaJohntay Wester	12	2023	Clemson
7	Asaad Waseem	12	2025	UConn
7	**Easton Messer**	12	2026	Rice

=== Receiving yards ===
Career
Rank	Player	Yards	Years
1	LaJohntay Wester	2,703	2020 2021 2022 2023
2	Cortez Gent	2,491	2006 2007 2008 2009
3	Harrison Bryant	2,137	2016 2017 2018 2019
4	Anthony Crissinger-Hill	2,071	2001 2003 2004
5	**Easton Messer**	2,035	2025 2026
6	Lestar Jean	1,992	2007 2008 2009 2010
7	Jenson Stoshak	1,885	2012 2013 2014 2015
8	William Dukes	1,866	2011 2012 2013 2014
9	Jason Harmon	1,745	2005 2006 2007 2008
10	Chris Bonner	1,591	2006 2007 2008 2009

Single season
Rank	Player	Yards	Year
1	LaJohntay Wester	1,168	2023
2	Anthony Crissinger-Hill	1,134	2003
3	Cortez Gent	1,082	2007
4	**Easton Messer**	1,052	2025
5	Harrison Bryant	1,004	2019
6	Lestar Jean	988	2010
7	William Dukes	979	2012
8	Cortez Gent	935	2008
9	**Easton Messer**	983	2026
10	Kalib Woods	934	2016

Single game
Rank	Player	Yards	Years	Opponent
1	LaJohntay Wester	219	2023	UAB
2	William Dukes	204	2012	Louisiana
3	**Easton Messer**	189	2026	North Texas
4	Anthony Crissinger-Hill	183	2004	Hawaii

=== Receiving touchdowns ===
Career
Rank	Player	TDs	Years
1	LaJohntay Wester	21	2020 2021 2022 2023
2	Cortez Gent	20	2006 2007 2008 2009
3	**Easton Messer**	18	2025 2026
4	Harrison Bryant	16	2016 2017 2018 2019
5	Lestar Jean	15	2007 2008 2009 2010
6	Anthony Crissinger-Hill	14	2001 2003 2004
7	Roosevelt Bynes	13	2003 2004
7	Jason Harmon	13	2005 2006 2007 2008
9	Chris Bonner	12	2006 2007 2008 2009
9	Nexon Dorvilus	12	2010 2011 2012 2013

Single season
Rank	Player	TDs	Year
1	**Easton Messer**	12	2026
2	Anthony Crissinger-Hill	9	2003
2	Roosevelt Bynes	9	2003
2	Cortez Gent	9	2007
2	Cortez Gent	9	2008
6	Lestar Jean	8	2010
6	LaJohntay Wester	8	2022
6	LaJohntay Wester	8	2023

Single game
Rank	Player	TDs	Years	Opponent
1	Deangelo Antoine	4	2019	Wagner
2	Cortez Gent	3	2008	FIU
2	John Mitchell	3	2019	Ball State
2	LaJohntay Wester	3	2022	Purdue
2	LaJohntay Wester	3	2023	UAB
2	**Easton Messer**	3	2025	Tulsa
2	**Kelby Valsin**	3	2026	Texas Southern
2	**Easton Messer**	3	2026	North Texas
2	**Easton Messer**	3	2026	UTSA

== Total offense ==
Total offense is the sum of passing and rushing statistics. It does not include receiving or returns.

=== Total offense yards ===
Career
Rank	Player	Yards	Years
1	Rusty Smith	9,777	2006 2007 2008 2009
2	Jared Allen	7,684	2001 2002 2003 2004
3	Jaquez Johnson	7,258	2013 2014 2015
4	**Caden Veltkamp**	6,398	2025 2026
5	Jason Driskel	6,318	2015 2016 2017
6	N'Kosi Perry	5,991	2021 2022
7	Devin Singletary	4,304	2016 2017 2018
8	Graham Wilbert	4,238	2009 2010 2011 2012
9	Jeff Van Camp	3,728	2007 2008 2009 2010
10	Alfred Morris	3,529	2008 2009 2010 2011

Single season
Rank	Player	Yards	Year
1	**Caden Veltkamp**	3,693	2025
2	Rusty Smith	3,572	2007
3	Rusty Smith	3,142	2008
4	N'Kosi Perry	2,971	2022
5	N'Kosi Perry	2,920	2021
6	Graham Wilbert	2,882	2012
7	Jared Allen	2,827	2003
8	Chris Robison	2,744	2018
9	Jaquez Johnson	2,728	2014
10	**Caden Veltkamp**	2,712	2026

Single game
Rank	Player	Yards	Years	Opponent
1	**Caden Veltkamp**	517	2025	UConn
2	Chris Robison	462	2018	Air Force
3	Rusty Smith	449	2007	Minnesota
4	**Caden Veltkamp**	444	2026	North Texas
5	Jason Driskel	425	2017	North Texas
6	Jaquez Johnson	420	2014	Western Kentucky
6	Cam Fancher	420	2024	North Texas

=== Touchdowns responsible for ===
"Touchdowns responsible for" is the official NCAA term for combined rushing and passing touchdowns. It does not include receiving or returns.

Career
Rank	Player	TDs	Years
1	Rusty Smith	81	2006 2007 2008 2009
2	Devin Singletary	66	2016 2017 2018
3	Jaquez Johnson	57	2013 2014 2015
3	**Caden Veltkamp**	57	2025 2026
5	Jared Allen	55	2001 2002 2003 2004
5	N'Kosi Perry	55	2021 2022
7	Jason Driskel	40	2015 2016 2017
8	Jeff Van Camp	33	2007 2008 2009 2010
9	Alfred Morris	27	2008 2009 2010 2011
9	Graham Wilbert	27	2009 2010 2011 2012

Single season
Rank	Player	TDs	Year
1	Rusty Smith	34	2007
2	Devin Singletary	32	2017
3	N'Kosi Perry	31	2022
4	**Caden Veltkamp**	29	2026
5	**Caden Veltkamp**	28	2025
6	Rusty Smith	26	2008
7	Jared Allen	24	2003
7	Jaquez Johnson	24	2014
7	N'Kosi Perry	24	2021
10	Jason Driskel	23	2017

Single game
Rank	Player	TDs	Years	Opponent
1	Rusty Smith	5	2007	Minnesota
1	Rusty Smith	5	2007	Memphis (New Orleans Bowl)
1	Rusty Smith	5	2008	FIU
1	Devin Singletary	5	2018	Bethune–Cookman
1	Chris Robison	5	2019	Wagner
1	N'Kosi Perry	5	2022	Ohio
1	Casey Thompson	5	2023	Monmouth
1	Tyriq Starks	5	2024	Tulsa
1	**Caden Veltkamp**	5	2025	Florida A&M
1	**Caden Veltkamp**	5	2026	Navy
1	**Caden Veltkamp**	5	2026	North Texas

== Defense ==
=== Interceptions ===
Career
Rank	Player	Ints	Years
1	Willie Hughley	15	2002 2003 2004 2005
2	Corey Small	13	2005 2006 2007 2008
3	Jalen Young	12	2015 2016 2017
4	Tavious Polo	11	2007 2008 2009 2010
5	Quincy Skinner	9	2002 2003 2004 2005
5	Taheem Acevedo	9	2004 2005 2006 2007
5	D'Joun Smith	9	2011 2012 2013 2014
5	Meiko Dotson	9	2019

Single season
Rank	Player	Ints	Year
1	Meiko Dotson	9	2019
2	Tavious Polo	7	2007
2	D'Joun Smith	7	2013
2	Jalen Young	7	2017
5	Willie Hughley	6	2004
6	Willie Hughley	5	2003
6	Quincy Skinner	5	2003
6	Corey Small	5	2007
6	Taheem Acevedo	5	2007

Single game
Rank	Player	Ints	Years	Opponent
1	Corey Small	3	2006	Arkansas State
1	Tavious Polo	3	2007	Minnesota
1	D'Joun Smith	3	2013	Tulane
1	Jalen Young	3	2017	Marshall

=== Tackles ===
Career
Rank	Player	Tackles	Years
1	Azeez Al-Shaair	395	2015 2016 2017 2018
2	Frantz Joseph	346	2006 2007 2008
3	Andrae Kirk	344	2011 2012 2013 2014
4	Rashad Smith	313	2016 2017 2018 2019
5	Marcus Bartels	297	2008 2009 2010 2011
6	Chris Laskowski	295	2001 2002 2003 2004
7	Cergile Sincere	272	2004 2005 2006 2007

Single season
Rank	Player	Tackles	Year
1	Frantz Joseph	154	2008
2	Azeez Al-Shaair	147	2017
3	Frantz Joseph	131	2007
4	Michael Lockley	120	2010
5	Cergile Sincere	118	2007
6	Azeez Al-Shaair	113	2016
7	Marcus Bartels	112	2009

Single game
Rank	Player	Tackles	Years	Opponent
1	Jerrell Terry	18	2002	Eastern Illinois
1	Corey Small	18	2007	Kentucky

=== Sacks ===
Career
Rank	Player	Sacks	Years
1	Trey Hendrickson	29.0	2013 2014 2015 2016
2	Leighton McCarthy	20.0	2017 2018 2019 2020
3	Cory Henry	16.0	2010 2011 2012 2013
4	Ramon Rickards	15.5	2001 2002 2003 2004
5	Brandin Bryant	13.5	2012 2013 2014 2015
6	Trevon Coley	12.5	2012 2013 2014 2015

Single season
Rank	Player	Sacks	Year
1	Trey Hendrickson	13.0	2015
2	Trey Hendrickson	9.5	2016
3	Leighton McCarthy	9.0	2020
4	Cory Henry	7.5	2013
4	Akileis Leroy	7.5	2019
6	Michael Hancock	6.0	2008
6	Brandin Bryant	6.0	2013
6	Martin Wright	6.0	2013
6	Rashad Smith	6.0	2017
6	Leighton McCarthy	6.0	2019
6	Jaylen Joyner	6.0	2020

Single game
Rank	Player	Sacks	Years	Opponent
1	Martin Wright	4.5	2013	FIU
2	Joe Walker	3.0	2001	Jacksonville
2	William Gray	3.0	2002	Bethune-Cookman
2	Chris Laskowski	3.0	2004	Middle Tennessee
2	Johnnie Sloan	3.0	2004	Texas State
2	Trey Hendrickson	3.0	2015	Charlotte
2	Leighton McCarthy	3.0	2020	Charlotte
2	Jaylen Joyner	3.0	2020	UTSA

== Kicking ==
=== Field goals made ===
Career
Rank	Player	FGs	Years	
1	Greg Joseph	57	2014 2015 2016 2017	
2	Mark Myers	43	2001 2002 2003 2004	
3	Warley Leroy	39	2005 2006 2007 2008	
4	Vladimir Rivas	35	2018 2019 2020	
5	Morgan Suarez	19	2021 2022 2024	
6	Mitch Anderson	18	2012 2013	
7	Ross Gornall	17	2008 2009 2010	
8	Garrison Smith	16	2025	
9	**Collin Rogers**	9	2026	
10	Vinny Zaccario	8	2010 2011 2012	
10		Aaron Shahriari	8	2019 2021

Single season
Rank	Player	FGs	Year
1	Mark Myers	20	2004
2	Warley Leroy	19	2007
3	Greg Joseph	18	2015
4	Vladimir Rivas	17	2019
5	Garrison Smith	16	2025
6	Greg Joseph	15	2017
7	Greg Joseph	14	2014
8	Mark Myers	12	2003

Single game
Rank	Player	FGs	Years	Opponent
1	Greg Joseph	4	2014	Wyoming
	Greg Joseph	4	2015	Old Dominion
3	Mark Myers	3	2003	Bethune-Cookman
	Mark Myers	3	2004	Hawaii
	Mark Myers	3	2004	Northern Colorado
	Warley Leroy	3	2007	North Texas
	Warley Leroy	3	2007	Louisiana-Monroe
	Warley Leroy	3	2008	Louisiana-Monroe
	Greg Joseph	3	2014	Marshall
	Greg Joseph	3	2015	Tulsa
	Morgan Suarez	3	2022	Charlotte
	Morgan Suarez	3	2024	North Texas
	**Collin Rogers**	3	2026	FIU

=== Field goal percentage ===
Career
Rank	Player	FG%	Years
1	Garrison Smith	84.2%	2025
2	Morgan Suarez	73.1%	2021 2022 2024
3	Mark Myers	72.9%	2001 2002 2003 2004
4	Greg Joseph	69.5%	2014 2015 2016 2017
5	Warley Leroy	68.4%	2005 2006 2007 2008
6	Vladimir Rivas	67.3%	2018 2019 2020
7	Ross Gornall	65.4%	2008 2009 2010
8	Vinny Zaccario	61.5%	2010 2011 2012
9	Mitch Anderson	58.1%	2012 2013

Single season
Rank	Player	FG%	Year
1	Garrison Smith	84.2%	2025
2	Mark Myers	80.0%	2003
	Vladimir Rivas	80.0%	2020
4	Warley Leroy	76.9%	2008
5	Mark Myers	75.0%	2002
6	Mark Myers	71.4%	2004
	Greg Joseph	71.4%	2016
	Greg Joseph	71.4%	2017
9	Warley Leroy	70.4%	2007

== Scoring ==
Florida Atlantic's 2017 football record book does not list a complete top 10 in overall scoring categories. Only the top 5 are listed for career and season categories, and only leaders for single-game categories. The lists of leaders entering the 2017 season have been supplemented by statistics from the 2017 and 2018 seasons.

=== Points ===
Career
Rank	Player	Points	Years
1	Devin Singletary	402	2016 2017 2018
2	Greg Joseph	336	2014 2015 2016 2017
3	Mark Myers	231	2001 2002 2003 2004
4	Warley Leroy	216	2005 2006 2007 2008
5	Alfred Morris	186	2008 2009 2010 2011
6	Doug Parker	150	2001 2003 2004

Single season
Rank	Player	Points	Year
1	Devin Singletary	198	2017
2	Devin Singletary	132	2018
3	Greg Joseph	109	2017
4	Warley Leroy	101	2007
5	Mark Myers	91	2004
6	Mark Myers	84	2003
	Garrison Smith	84	2025
8	Alfred Morris	78	2009
	Gregory Howell	78	2016

Single game
Rank	Player	Points	Year	Opponent
1	Devin Singletary	30	2018	Bethune–Cookman
1	**Easton Messer**	30	2026	Rice
3	Doug Parker	24	2001	Jacksonville
3	Alfred Morris	24	2011	UAB
3	Devin Singletary	24	2017	Middle Tennessee
3	Jason Driskel	24	2017	Old Dominion
3	Devin Singletary	24	2017	Western Kentucky

=== Touchdowns ===
These lists count touchdowns scored. Accordingly, these lists include rushing, receiving, and return touchdowns, but not passing touchdowns.

Career
Rank	Player	TDs	Years
1	Devin Singletary	67	2016 2017 2018
2	Alfred Morris	31	2008 2009 2010 2011
3	Doug Parker	25	2001 2003 2004
4	Charles Pierre	24	2005 2006 2007 2008
	LaJohntay Wester	24	2020 2021 2022 2023
6	Gregory Howell	22	2014 2015 2016 2017
7	Larry McCammon	21	2019 2020 2021 2022 2023
8	Cortez Gent	20	2006 2007 2008 2009
9	Jaquez Johnson	19	2013 2014 2015

Single season
Rank	Player	TDs	Year
1	Devin Singletary	33	2017
2	Devin Singletary	22	2018
3	**Easton Messer**	16	2026
4	CJ Campbell Jr.	14	2024
5	Alfred Morris	13	2009
5	Gregory Howell	13	2016
7	Devin Singletary	12	2016
8	Alfred Morris	10	2011
8	Jaquez Johnson	10	2013
8	LaJohntay Wester	10	2023

Single game
Rank	Player	TDs	Year	Opponent
1	Devin Singletary	5	2018	Bethune–Cookman
1	**Easton Messer**	5	2026	Rice
3	Doug Parker	4	2001	Jacksonville
3	Alfred Morris	4	2011	UAB
3	Devin Singletary	4	2017	Middle Tennessee
3	Jason Driskel	4	2017	Old Dominion
3	Devin Singletary	4	2017	Western Kentucky
