= List of Florida Atlantic Owls football seasons =

This is a list of seasons completed by the Florida Atlantic Owls football team. Representing Florida Atlantic University, the Owls compete in Conference USA in the NCAA Division I. They have played their home games out of FAU Stadium since 2011. Florida Atlantic is currently led by head coach Zach Kittley.

Florida Atlantic began playing football in 2001, initially competing as a Division I-AA (now FCS) independent for three years before joining the rankings of Division I-A (now FBS) as an independent in 2004. While in Division I-AA, the Owls made the playoffs in 2003, advancing to the semifinals before falling to Colgate. In 2005, FAU joined the ranks of the Sun Belt Conference, where they would remain for eight seasons before leaving for Conference USA where they currently compete. The Owls were co-champions of the Sun Belt in 2007, and played in the school's first-ever bowl game, a 44–27 win in the 2007 New Orleans Bowl against Memphis. The following season, FAU qualified for a bowl game again and won the 2008 Motor City Bowl over Central Michigan.

== Seasons ==
Legend

†National Champions
^{†} Conference champions
^{‡} Division champions
^Bowl game berth/Playoff Result

List of Florida Atlantic Owls football seasons
Season	Team	Head coach	Conference	Division	Regular season results							Postseason results	Final ranking	
Season	Team	Head coach	Conference	Division	Overall			Conference				Bowl game/Playoff result	TSN/AP Poll	Coaches' Poll
Season	Team	Head coach	Conference	Division	Win	Loss	Tie	Win	Loss	Tie	Finish	Bowl game/Playoff result	TSN/AP Poll	Coaches' Poll
Florida Atlantic Owls
2001	2001	Howard Schnellenberger	FCS Independent	—	4	6					—	—	—	—
2002	2002	Howard Schnellenberger	FCS Independent	—	2	9					—	—	—	—
2003	2003	Howard Schnellenberger	FCS Independent	—	11	3					—	2003 NCAA Division I-AA Playoffs — Semifinals	4	—
2004	2004	Howard Schnellenberger	FBS Independent	—	9	3					—	—	—	—
2005	2005	Howard Schnellenberger	Sun Belt	—	2	9		2	5		T–7th	—	—	—
2006	2006	Howard Schnellenberger	Sun Belt	—	5	7		4	3		T–3rd	—	—	—
2007	2007^{†}	Howard Schnellenberger	Sun Belt	—	8	5		6	1		T–1st^{†}	Won 2007 New Orleans Bowl against Memphis Tigers, 44–27 ^	—	—
2008	2008	Howard Schnellenberger	Sun Belt	—	7	6		4	3		T–3rd	Won 2008 Motor City Bowl against Central Michigan Chippewas, 24–21 ^	—	—
2009	2009	Howard Schnellenberger	Sun Belt	—	5	7		5	3		T–3rd	—	—	—
2010	2010	Howard Schnellenberger	Sun Belt	—	4	8		3	5		T–6th	—	—	—
2011	2011	Howard Schnellenberger	Sun Belt	—	1	11		0	8		9th	—	—	—
2012	2012	Carl Pelini	Sun Belt	—	3	9		2	6		T–8th	—	—	—
2013	2013	Carl Pelini; Brian Wright	C–USA	East	6	6		4	4		4th	—	—	—
2014	2014	Charlie Partridge	C–USA	East	3	9		2	6		7th	—	—	—
2015	2015	Charlie Partridge	C–USA	East	3	9		3	5		6th	—	—	—
2016	2016	Charlie Partridge	C–USA	East	3	9		2	6		7th	—	—	—
2017	2017^{†}	Lane Kiffin	C–USA	East	11	3		8	0		1st^{†}	Won 2017 Boca Raton Bowl against Akron Zips 50–3 ^	—	—
2018	2018	Lane Kiffin	C–USA	East	5	7		3	5		5th	—	—	—
2019	2019^{†}	Lane Kiffin; Glenn Spencer	C–USA	East	11	3		7	1		1st^{†}	Won 2019 Boca Raton Bowl against SMU Mustangs 52–28 ^	—	—
2020	2020	Willie Taggart	C–USA	East	5	4		4	2		T–3rd	Lost 2020 Montgomery Bowl against Memphis Tigers, 10–25 ^	—	—
2021	2021	Willie Taggart	C–USA	East	5	7		3	5		T–5th	—	—	—
2022	2022	Willie Taggart	C–USA	—	5	7		4	4		T–4th (no divisions)	—	—	—
2023	2023	Tom Herman	American Athletic Conference	—	4	8		3	5		T–9th (no divisions)	—	—	—
2024	2024	Tom Herman	American Athletic Conference	—	3	9		1	7		8th (no divisions)	—	—	—
2025	2025	Zach Kittley	American Athletic Conference	—	4	8		3	5		T–9th (no divisions)	—	—	—
Totals					All-time: 126–164–0 (.434)			Conference: 72–82–0 (.468)			—	Postseason: 6–2 (.750); Bowls: 4-1 (.800)	—	—
