= List of Florida Atlantic Owls in the NFL draft =

This is a list of Florida Atlantic Owls football players in the NFL draft.

== Key ==
B	Back	K	Kicker	NT	Nose tackle
C	Center	LB	Linebacker	FB	Fullback
DB	Defensive back	P	Punter	HB	Halfback
DE	Defensive end	QB	Quarterback	WR	Wide receiver
DT	Defensive tackle	RB	Running back	G	Guard
E	End	T	Offensive tackle	TE	Tight end

== Selections ==
Year	Round	Pick	Player	Team	Position
2010	6	176	Rusty Smith	Tennessee Titans	QB
2011	3	69	Rob Housler	Arizona Cardinals	TE
2012	6	173	Alfred Morris	Washington Redskins	RB
2014	5	170	Keith Reaser	San Francisco 49ers	DB
2014	7	221	Randell Johnson	Buffalo Bills	LB
2015	3	65	D'Joun Smith	Indianapolis Colts	DB
2017	3	103	Trey Hendrickson	New Orleans Saints	LB
2019	3	74	Devin Singletary	Buffalo Bills	RB
2019	7	222	Kerrith Whyte	Chicago Bears	RB
2020	4	115	Harrison Bryant	Cleveland Browns	TE
