= Easton Messer =

American football player (born 2004)

- Messer with Florida Atlantic in 2026

No. 8 – Florida Atlantic Owls
- Position: Wide receiver
- Class: Redshirt Senior

Personal information
- Born: January 6, 2004 (age 22)
- Listed height: 5 ft 9 in (1.75 m)
- Listed weight: 190 lb (86 kg)

Career information
- High school: Christian Academy of Louisville (Louisville, Kentucky)
- College: Western Kentucky (2022–2024); Florida Atlantic (2025–present)

Awards and highlights
- Second-team All-AAC (2025)
- Stats at ESPN

Easton Messer (born January 6, 2004) is an American football wide receiver for the Florida Atlantic Owls. He previously played for the Western Kentucky Hilltoppers.

== Early life ==
Messer attended Christian Academy of Louisville in Louisville, Kentucky. He committed to play college football for the Western Kentucky Hilltoppers.

== College career ==
=== Western Kentucky ===
Messer made his collegiate debut in Week 4 of the 2022 season against FIU, catching his first career reception for a 44-yard touchdown in a 73–0 victory. He appeared in three games during the season and retained his redshirt.

In 2023, Messer recorded his first 100-yard receiving performance in a Week 2 victory over Houston Christian, finishing with a season-high nine receptions for 116 yards and a touchdown. In the 2023 Famous Toastery Bowl, he had seven receptions for 68 yards in an overtime victory over Old Dominion. He finished the season with 42 receptions for 484 yards and four touchdowns. As the team's primary kickoff returner, he recorded 15 returns for 333 yards, averaging 22.2 yards per return, which led Conference USA. He appeared in all 13 games, making one start.

In 2024, Messer appeared in all 14 games and made nine starts. In the 2024 Conference USA Football Championship Game, he recorded seven receptions for 83 yards in a loss to Jacksonville State. He entered the NCAA transfer portal on December 9, 2024, but remained with Western Kentucky for the 2024 Boca Raton Bowl, recording three receptions for 68 yards in a loss to James Madison. He finished the season with 55 receptions for 793 yards and four touchdowns. In three seasons at Western Kentucky from 2022 to 2024, Messer recorded 98 receptions for 1,321 yards and nine touchdowns.

=== Florida Atlantic ===
On December 23, 2024, Messer transferred to play for the Florida Atlantic Owls. He joined fellow Western Kentucky quarterback Caden Veltkamp, who announced his transfer the same day. In the 2025 season opener against Maryland, Messer recorded a career-high 15 receptions for 87 yards in a loss. His 15 receptions tied the Florida Atlantic single-game record, set by Anthony Crissinger-Hill in 2004. In Week 9 against Tulsa, he recorded six receptions for 83 yards and three touchdowns in a victory. Messer recorded at least 10 receptions in four games and at least 100 receiving yards in four games. He started all 12 games, finishing with an American Conference-leading 104 receptions for 1,052 yards and six touchdowns. His reception total ranked third nationally behind Malachi Toney and Jacob De Jesus and was the second-highest single-season total in program history, behind LaJohntay Wester's 108 receptions in 2023. Messer also recorded his first career rushing and passing touchdowns. Messer also led the American Conference with 250 punt-return yards and an average of 20.8 yards per return on 12 attempts. Under first-year head coach Zach Kittley, Florida Atlantic finished the season 4–8. Messer was named to the second team of the American Conference as a wide receiver. In May 2026, Messer accepted an invitation to participate in the Wideout Workshop, a three-day event hosted by former NFL wide receiver Chad Johnson.

In the 2026 season opener against Florida, Messer recorded seven receptions for 73 yards in a loss. The following week against Navy, he had eight receptions for 179 yards and two touchdowns in a victory. In Week 4, Messer returned a punt 73 yards for a touchdown in a victory over Louisiana–Monroe, earning American Conference Special Teams Player of the Week honors. In Week 6 against Army, he recorded 14 receptions for 102 yards and a touchdown in a loss. The following week against Rice, Messer helped lead Florida Atlantic to a 51–49 victory, recording 12 receptions for 162 yards and two touchdowns, scoring twice on the ground, and returning a punt 82 yards for a touchdown. His five touchdowns made him the only FBS player in the previous 20 seasons to record two rushing touchdowns, two receiving touchdowns, and a punt-return touchdown in the same game. His 30 points tied former Florida Atlantic running back Devin Singletary's single-game program record, while his five touchdowns tied the program record for touchdowns in a game. Messer was named American Conference Offensive Player of the Week. messer also threw for a touchdown on November 5 against USTA.

=== Statistics ===
Offense

Year	Team	Games		Receiving				Rushing			
Year	Team	GP	GS	Rec	Yds	Avg	TD	Att	Yds	Avg	TD
2022	Western Kentucky	3	0	1	44	44.0	1	0	0	0.0	0
2023	Western Kentucky	13	1	42	484	11.5	4	2	16	8.0	0
2024	Western Kentucky	14	9	55	793	14.4	4	9	37	4.1	0
2025	Florida Atlantic	12	12	104	1,052	10.1	6	3	45	15.0	1
2026	Florida Atlantic	9	9	81	983	12.1	12	4	26	6.5	2
Career		51	31	283	3,356	11.9	27	18	124	6.9	3

Special teams

Year	Team	Games		Kick returns				Punt returns			
Year	Team	GP	GS	Ret	Yds	Avg	TD	Ret	Yds	Avg	TD
2022	Western Kentucky	3	7	0	0	0.0	0	0	0	0.0	0
2023	Western Kentucky	13	1	15	333	22.2	0	0	0	0.0	0
2024	Western Kentucky	14	9	19	457	24.1	0	0	0	0.0	0
2025	Florida Atlantic	12	12	1	3	3.0	0	12	250	20.8	0
2026	Florida Atlantic	9	9	0	0	0.0	0	11	247	22.5	2
Career		51	31	35	793	22.7	0	23	497	21.6	2
