= 2013 Armed Forces Bowl =

American college football game

2013 Bell Helicopter Armed Forces Bowl
Middle Tennessee Blue Raiders	Navy Midshipmen
(8–4)	(8–4)
C-USA	Independent
6	24
Head coach: Rick Stockstill	Head coach: Ken Niumatalolo
	1	2	3	4	Total
Middle Tennessee	3	3	0	0	6
Navy	7	3	0	14	24
- Date: December 30, 2013
- Season: 2013
- Stadium: Amon G. Carter Stadium
- Location: Fort Worth, Texas
- Referee: Mark Kluczynski (MAC)
- Attendance: 39,246
- Payout: US$$600,000

United States TV coverage
- Network: ESPN/ESPN Radio
- Announcers: Beth Mowins (play-by-play); Joey Galloway (analyst); Paul Carcaterra (sidelines)

The 2013 Armed Forces Bowl was an American college football bowl game that was played on December 30, 2013, at Amon G. Carter Stadium on the campus of Texas Christian University in Fort Worth, Texas. The eleventh edition of the Armed Forces Bowl (which was originally known as the Fort Worth Bowl), it featured the Middle Tennessee Blue Raiders of Conference USA against the Navy Midshipmen, an independent team. It began at 10:45 a.m. CST and aired on ESPN. It was one of the 2013–14 bowl games that concluded the 2013 FBS football season. The game was sponsored by Bell Helicopter and was officially known as the Bell Helicopter Armed Forces Bowl. Navy defeated Middle Tennessee by a score of 24–6.

The Midshipmen accepted their invitation after earning a 6–4 record in their first ten games of the season, while the Blue Raiders accepted their invitation after earning an 8–4 record in theirs.

== Team selection ==
=== Middle Tennessee Blue Raiders ===
The Blue Raiders' first season as a member of Conference USA saw them continue their winning ways as they finished 8–4 overall and 6–2 in conference play (tied with the East Carolina Pirates for second in the C-USA East Division). At season's end, bowl director Brant Ringler extended an invitation to the Blue Raiders to play in the game.

This was Middle Tennessee's first Armed Forces bowl.

=== Navy Midshipmen ===
In April 2009, organizers announced that they had reached a deal with Navy to play in the 2013 edition of the Armed Forces Bowl. After defeating the South Alabama Jaguars for their sixth win of the season on November 16, bowl director Brant Rigler extended an invitation to play in the game.

This was Navy's first Armed Forces Bowl, making them the last of the FBS' three service academies to reach the bowl (Air Force reached the bowl in 2007, 2008, 2009 and 2012, with Army reaching the bowl in 2010).

== Game summary ==
=== Scoring summary ===
Scoring summary

Quarter	Time	Drive			Team	Scoring information	Score	
Quarter	Time	Plays	Yards	TOP	Team	Scoring information	MTSU	Navy
1	10:01	10	59	4:59	NAVY	Keenan Reynolds 3-yard touchdown run, Nick Sloan kick good	0	7
1	4:08	13	56	5:53	MTSU	43-yard field goal by Cody Clark	3	7
2	14:16	11	46	4:52	NAVY	32-yard field goal by Sloan	3	10
2	6:38	9	36	3:53	MTSU	24-yard field goal by Clark	6	10
4	10:48	11	80	4:12	NAVY	Reynolds 1-yard touchdown run, Sloan kick good	6	17
4	9:16	2	43	0:50	NAVY	DeBrandon Sanders 41-yard touchdown run, Sloan kick good	6	24
"TOP" = time of possession. For other American football terms, see Glossary of American football.							6	24
