= 2013 UAB Blazers football team =

American college football season

2013 UAB Blazers football
- Conference: Conference USA
- East Division
- Record: 2–10 (1–7 C-USA)
- Head coach: Garrick McGee (2nd season)
- Offensive coordinator: Richard Owens (1st season)
- Offensive scheme: Multiple
- Defensive coordinator: Reggie Johnson (2nd season)
- Base defense: 4–3
- Home stadium: Legion Field

2013 Conference USA football standings
	Conf.			Overall
Team	W		L	W		L
East Division
Marshall x	7	–	1	10	–	4
East Carolina	6	–	2	10	–	3
Middle Tennessee	6	–	2	8	–	5
Florida Atlantic	4	–	4	6	–	6
UAB	1	–	7	2	–	10
Southern Miss	1	–	7	1	–	11
FIU	1	–	7	1	–	11
West Division
Rice x$	7	–	1	10	–	4
UTSA	6	–	2	7	–	5
North Texas	6	–	2	9	–	4
Tulane	5	–	3	7	–	6
Louisiana Tech	3	–	5	4	–	8
Tulsa	2	–	6	3	–	9
UTEP	1	–	7	2	–	10
Championship: Rice 41, Marshall 24
$ – Conference champion; x – Division champion/co-champions; Rankings from AP Poll

The 2013 UAB Blazers football team represented the University of Alabama at Birmingham (UAB) as a member of the East Division in Conference USA (C-USA) during the 2013 NCAA Division I FBS football season. Led by Garrick McGee in his second and final season as head coach, the Blazers compiled an overall record of 2–10 with a mark of 1–7 in conference play, placing in three-way tie for fifth at the bottom of the standings in C-USA's East Division. The team played home games at Legion Field in Birmingham, Alabama.

== Schedule ==
Date	Time	Opponent	Site	TV	Result	Attendance
August 31	6:00 p.m.	at Troy*	Veterans Memorial Stadium; Troy, AL	ESPN3	L 31–34 ^{OT}	21,398
September 7	6:00 p.m.	at No. 9 LSU*	Tiger Stadium; Baton Rouge, LA	ESPNU	L 17–56	90,037
September 21	2:00 p.m.	Northwestern State*	Legion Field; Birmingham, AL		W 52–28	8,723
September 28	6:30 p.m.	at Vanderbilt*	Vanderbilt Stadium; Nashville, TN	ESPN3	L 24–52	32,467
October 5	2:00 p.m.	Florida Atlantic	Legion Field; Birmingham, AL		L 23–37	11,319
October 12	6:30 p.m.	at FIU	FIU Stadium; Miami, FL	CSS	W 27–24	15,696
October 26	4:00 p.m.	at UTSA	Alamodome; San Antonio, TX	TWCSC	L 31–52	25,391
November 2	12:00 p.m.	Middle Tennessee	Legion Field; Birmingham, AL	FSN	L 21–24	20,483
November 9	11:00 a.m.	at Marshall	Joan C. Edwards Stadium; Huntington, WV	CSS	L 14–56	22,321
November 16	1:00 p.m.	at East Carolina	Dowdy–Ficklen Stadium; Greenville, NC	WITN	L 14–63	42,603
November 21	6:30 p.m.	Rice	Legion Field; Birmingham, AL	FS1	L 34–37 ^{OT}	5,831
November 30	12:00 p.m.	Southern Miss	Legion Field; Birmingham, AL		L 27–62	6,383
*Non-conference game; Rankings from AP Poll released prior to the game; All times are in Central time

== Awards ==
Jamarcus Nelson:

- All-American
- Conference USA special teams player of the year
