= 2013 Southern Miss Golden Eagles football team =

American college football season

2013 Southern Miss Golden Eagles football
- Conference: Conference USA
- East Division
- Record: 1–11 (1–7 C-USA)
- Head coach: Todd Monken (1st season)
- Offensive coordinator: Marcus Arroyo (1st season)
- Offensive scheme: Spread
- Defensive coordinator: David Duggan (2nd season)
- Base defense: 4–3
- Home stadium: M. M. Roberts Stadium

2013 Conference USA football standings
	Conf.			Overall
Team	W		L	W		L
East Division
Marshall x	7	–	1	10	–	4
East Carolina	6	–	2	10	–	3
Middle Tennessee	6	–	2	8	–	5
Florida Atlantic	4	–	4	6	–	6
UAB	1	–	7	2	–	10
Southern Miss	1	–	7	1	–	11
FIU	1	–	7	1	–	11
West Division
Rice x$	7	–	1	10	–	4
UTSA	6	–	2	7	–	5
North Texas	6	–	2	9	–	4
Tulane	5	–	3	7	–	6
Louisiana Tech	3	–	5	4	–	8
Tulsa	2	–	6	3	–	9
UTEP	1	–	7	2	–	10
Championship: Rice 41, Marshall 24
$ – Conference champion; x – Division champion/co-champions; Rankings from AP Poll

The 2013 Southern Miss Golden Eagles football team represented the University of Southern Mississippi in the 2013 NCAA Division I FBS football season as a member of the East Division of Conference USA. They were led by first-year head coach Todd Monken and played their home games at M. M. Roberts Stadium in Hattiesburg, Mississippi. They finished the season 1–11, 1–7 in C-USA play to finish in a three-way tie for fifth place in the East Division.

== Schedule ==
Date	Time	Opponent	Site	TV	Result	Attendance
August 31	6:00 pm	Texas State*	M. M. Roberts Stadium; Hattiesburg, MS		L 15–22	25,729
September 7	5:00 pm	at No. 22 Nebraska*	Memorial Stadium; Lincoln, NE	BTN	L 13–56	90,466
September 14	11:21 am	at Arkansas*	Donald W. Reynolds Razorback Stadium; Fayetteville, AR	SECTV	L 3–24	63,067
September 28	9:15 pm	at Boise State*	Bronco Stadium; Boise, ID	ESPNU	L 7–60	35,356
October 5	3:00 pm	FIU	M. M. Roberts Stadium; Hattiesburg, MS	CSS	L 23–24	21,891
October 19	11:00 am	at East Carolina	Dowdy–Ficklen Stadium; Greenville, NC	FSN	L 14–55	45,005
October 26	6:00 pm	North Texas^{†}	M. M. Roberts Stadium; Hattiesburg, MS	FCS	L 14–55	23,203
November 2	11:00 am	at Marshall	Joan C. Edwards Stadium; Huntington, WV	CBSSN	L 13–61	20,398
November 9	6:00 pm	at Louisiana Tech	Joe Aillet Stadium; Ruston, LA (Rivalry in Dixie)	CBSSN	L 13–36	18,571
November 16	11:30 am	Florida Atlantic	M. M. Roberts Stadium; Hattiesburg, MS	CSS	L 7–41	20,802
November 23	2:30 pm	Middle Tennessee	M. M. Roberts Stadium; Hattiesburg, MS	CSS	L 21–42	22,134
November 30	12:00 pm	at UAB	Legion Field; Birmingham, AL		W 62–27	6,383
*Non-conference game; ^{†}Homecoming; Rankings from AP Poll; All times are in Central time

Schedule source:

== Game summaries ==
=== Texas State ===
	1	2	3	4	Total
Bobcats	7	7	0	8	22
Golden Eagles	0	3	9	3	15

=== At Nebraska ===
	1	2	3	4	Total
Golden Eagles	3	3	7	0	13
#22 Cornhuskers	21	14	14	7	56

=== At Arkansas ===
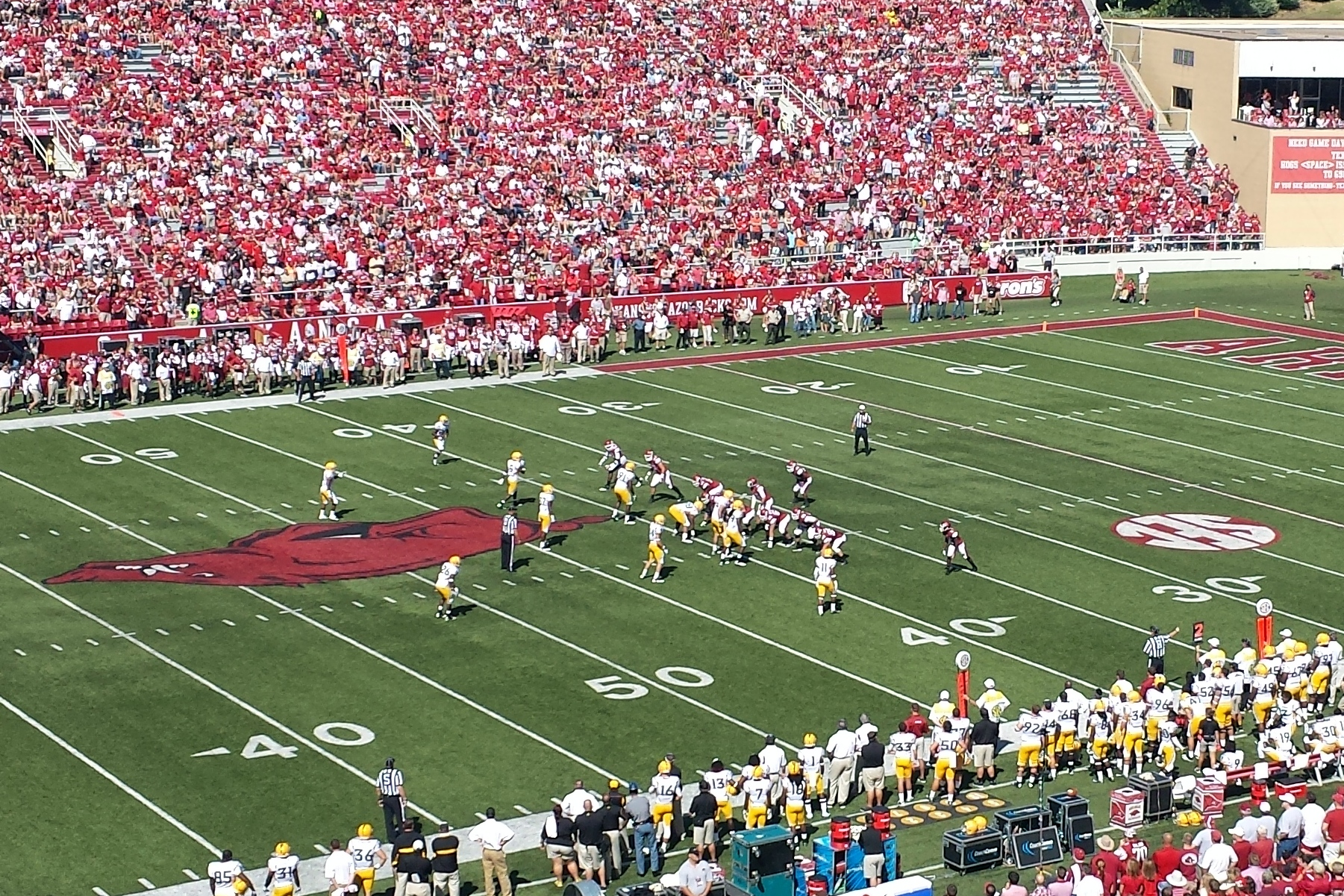
The Arkansas offense prepares to snap the ball against the Southern Miss defense

	1	2	3	4	Total
Golden Eagles	0	3	0	0	3
Razorbacks	7	3	7	7	24

=== At Boise State ===
	1	2	3	4	Total
Golden Eagles	0	7	0	0	7
Broncos	7	23	17	13	60

=== FIU ===
	1	2	3	4	Total
Panthers	0	21	0	3	24
Golden Eagles	7	9	7	0	23

=== At East Carolina ===
	1	2	3	4	Total
Golden Eagles	0	0	0	14	14
Pirates	14	17	24	0	55

=== North Texas ===
	1	2	3	4	Total
Mean Green	13	28	7	7	55
Golden Eagles	0	7	7	0	14

=== At Marshall ===
	1	2	3	4	Total
Golden Eagles	0	10	3	0	13
Thundering Herd	28	7	13	13	61

=== At Louisiana Tech ===
	1	2	3	4	Total
Golden Eagles	0	6	0	7	13
Bulldogs	9	7	6	14	36

=== Florida Atlantic ===
	1	2	3	4	Total
Owls	7	20	14	0	41
Golden Eagles	0	0	0	7	7

=== Middle Tennessee ===
	1	2	3	4	Total
Blue Raiders	7	21	0	14	42
Golden Eagles	7	0	7	7	21

=== At UAB ===
	1	2	3	4	Total
Golden Eagles	7	6	28	21	62
Blazers	14	7	0	6	27
