= 2013 FIU Panthers football team =

American college football season

2013 FIU Panthers football
- Conference: Conference USA
- East Division
- Record: 1–11 (1–7 C-USA)
- Head coach: Ron Turner (1st season)
- Offensive scheme: Pro set
- Defensive coordinator: Josh Conklin (1st season)
- Base defense: Multiple 4–3
- Home stadium: FIU Stadium

2013 Conference USA football standings
	Conf.			Overall
Team	W		L	W		L
East Division
Marshall x	7	–	1	10	–	4
East Carolina	6	–	2	10	–	3
Middle Tennessee	6	–	2	8	–	5
Florida Atlantic	4	–	4	6	–	6
UAB	1	–	7	2	–	10
Southern Miss	1	–	7	1	–	11
FIU	1	–	7	1	–	11
West Division
Rice x$	7	–	1	10	–	4
UTSA	6	–	2	7	–	5
North Texas	6	–	2	9	–	4
Tulane	5	–	3	7	–	6
Louisiana Tech	3	–	5	4	–	8
Tulsa	2	–	6	3	–	9
UTEP	1	–	7	2	–	10
Championship: Rice 41, Marshall 24
$ – Conference champion; x – Division champion/co-champions; Rankings from AP Poll

The 2013 FIU Panthers football team represented Florida International University (FIU) during the 2013 NCAA Division I FBS football season. They were led by first year head coach Ron Turner and played their home games at FIU Stadium. This was their first year as a member of Conference USA in the East Division and they finished the season with a 1–11 record.

== Schedule ==
Date	Time	Opponent	Site	TV	Result	Attendance
August 31	12:30 p.m.	at Maryland*	Byrd Stadium; College Park, MD	ACCN	L 10–43	36,321
September 6	8:00 p.m.	UCF*	FIU Stadium; Miami, FL	CBSSN	L 0–38	15,823
September 14	6:00 p.m.	No. 23 (FCS) Bethune-Cookman*	FIU Stadium; Miami, FL		L 13–34	14,957
September 21	12:00 p.m.	at No. 7 Louisville*	Papa John's Cardinal Stadium; Louisville, KY	ESPN3	L 0–72	51,586
October 5	4:00 p.m.	at Southern Miss	M. M. Roberts Stadium; Hattiesburg, MS	CSS	W 24–23	21,891
October 12	7:30 p.m.	UAB^{†}	FIU Stadium; Miami, FL	CSS	L 24–27	15,696
October 26	6:00 p.m.	Louisiana Tech	FIU Stadium; Miami, FL		L 7–23	13,389
November 2	6:00 p.m.	East Carolina	FIU Stadium; Miami, FL	WITN	L 13–34	16,961
November 9	4:00 p.m.	at Middle Tennessee	Johnny "Red" Floyd Stadium; Murfreesboro, TN	FCS	L 0–48	16,717
November 16	8:00 p.m.	at UTEP	Sun Bowl Stadium; El Paso, TX		L 10–33	29,882
November 23	6:00 p.m.	Marshall	FIU Stadium; Miami, FL	FCS	L 10–48	15,891
November 29	3:00 p.m.	at Florida Atlantic	FAU Stadium; Boca Raton, FL (Shula Bowl)	FS1	L 6–21	10,428
*Non-conference game; ^{†}Homecoming; Rankings from AP Poll released prior to the game; All times are in Eastern time
