= Jeff Van Camp =

American football player (born 1987)

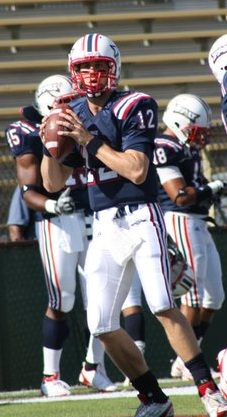

Profile
- Position: Quarterback

Personal information
- Born: September 9, 1987 (age 39); Pensacola, Florida, U.S.
- Listed height: 6 ft 5 in (1.96 m)
- Listed weight: 215 lb (98 kg)

Career information
- High school: Navarre (FL)
- College: Florida Atlantic Owls (2007–2010)

Jeff Van Camp (born September 9, 1987) is an American former football quarterback. He played college football at Florida Atlantic University, under head coach Howard Schnellenberger, as well as high school football at Navarre High School in Navarre, Florida.

== High school ==
Van Camp's junior year campaign was halted by the effect that Hurricane Ivan had on the Navarre community. Forced to assist with his family's needs, his football season would be cut short. During his senior year, Van Camp lead the Navarre Raiders to a 4-8 team record that was plagued by inconsistency from a young core. In a pro-style double-wing formation offense, Van Camp was able to put together a 997 yards, 5 TDs season over 10 games in which earned him an invitation to the local area's highschool all-star game. Van Camp was also able to lead Navarre's two-senior member basketball team in points, rebounds, and blocks, numbers. As a two-sport athlete, Van Camp was awarded the Santa Rosa County Athlete of the Year honor.

== College career ==
Initially offered a scholarship to Quincy University, Van Camp had a change of heart when he received a phone call from FAU staff members the morning of signing day offering him the prospect of a full scholarship close to home. In a quarterback class that included himself and Rusty Smith, Van Camp was redshirted his freshman year. Over the course of the 2007 & 2008 seasons, Van Camp would serve as Smith's backup, accumulating statistics of 10/25, 74 yards, 0 TDs, 2 INT, 1 rushing TD, 2 sacks in mop-up duties, as Smith would lead the Owls to a Sun Belt Conference Championship and 2007 New Orleans Bowl & 2008 Motor City Bowl wins.

=== Junior year ===
Van Camp began the 2009 season behind senior Rusty Smith again. During a game against Middle Tennessee, Van Camp was thrust into action after Smith went down with a shoulder injury. With Smith sidelined for the remainder of the season, Van Camp received his first collegiate start the next week against University of Alabama-Birmingham. Van Camp finished the season 3-2 as a starter, accumulating statistics of 109/184, 1372 yards, 12 TDs, 2 INTs, 3 rushing TDs, 13 sacks, earning a QB rating of 141.23.

=== Senior year ===
Van Camp's senior season began with much excitement and enthusiasm as many expected FAU to compete for the Sun Belt Conference championship after Van Camp's breakout junior season. After leading the team to a come-from-behind 32-31 win against UAB and competing in a 30-17 losing effort against Michigan State, FAU embarked on a 5-game losing streak. Out of conference contention, Van Camp lead to Owls to a three-game win streak, including a 3 touchdown effort against Louisiana-Lafayette. The Owls then finished the season on a three-game losing streak, including a season ending loss to rival Troy. Plagued with having to replace eight offensive starters, Van Camp was still able to put up the fourth best conference numbers, accumulating statistics of 192/335, 2459 yards, 17 TDs, 13 INTs, 34 sacks, earning a QB rating of 127.95.

=== Statistics ===
		Passing								Rushing		
Season	Team	GP	Rating	Att	Comp	Pct	Yds	TD	Int	Att	Yds	TD
2007	FAU	-	71.92	5	2	40.0	19	0	0	5	-17	1
2008	FAU	-	53.10	20	8	40.0	55	0	1	3	10	0
2009	FAU	6	141.23	184	109	59.2	1372	12	2	35	19	3
2010	FAU	12	127.95	335	192	57.3	2459	17	13	55	-189	0

== Professional career ==
Pre-draft measurables
Height	Weight	Arm length	Hand span	40-yard dash	10-yard split	20-yard split	20-yard shuttle	Three-cone drill	Vertical jump	Broad jump
6 ft 5 1/4 in (1.96 m)	218 lb (99 kg)	32 1/2 in (0.83 m)	10 1/4 in (0.26 m)	4.88 s	1.72 s	2.87 s	4.16 s	6.87 s	31.0 in (0.79 m)	9 ft 6 in (2.90 m)
All values from NFL Combine

Van Camp was rated the 20th best quarterback in the 2011 NFL draft by NFLDraftScout.com. NFL.com's Next Gen Stats Draft Model rated Van Camp as the 13th best quarterback at the NFL Combine, but stated that he "likely needs time in [a] developmental league". He never signed with an NFL team.

== Personal life ==
Born to Bridgette and Jeff Van Camp Sr. in Pensacola, Florida, Van Camp grew up in the small beachfront community of Tiger Point, between Gulf Breeze and Navarre. He has a younger brother named Brandon. Van Camp completed his studies at Florida Atlantic University in December 2010, majoring in political science and interdisciplinary studies.
