= 2013 Marshall Thundering Herd football team =

American college football season

2013 Marshall Thundering Herd football

C-USA East Division champion Military Bowl champion

C-USA Championship Game, L 24–41 vs. Rice

Military Bowl, W 31–20 vs. Maryland
- Conference: Conference USA
- East Division
- Record: 10–4 (7–1 C-USA)
- Head coach: Doc Holliday (4th season)
- Offensive coordinator: Bill Legg (4th season)
- Offensive scheme: Spread
- Defensive coordinator: Chuck Heater (1st season)
- Base defense: 3–4
- Home stadium: Joan C. Edwards Stadium

2013 Conference USA football standings
	Conf.			Overall
Team	W		L	W		L
East Division
Marshall x	7	–	1	10	–	4
East Carolina	6	–	2	10	–	3
Middle Tennessee	6	–	2	8	–	5
Florida Atlantic	4	–	4	6	–	6
UAB	1	–	7	2	–	10
Southern Miss	1	–	7	1	–	11
FIU	1	–	7	1	–	11
West Division
Rice x$	7	–	1	10	–	4
UTSA	6	–	2	7	–	5
North Texas	6	–	2	9	–	4
Tulane	5	–	3	7	–	6
Louisiana Tech	3	–	5	4	–	8
Tulsa	2	–	6	3	–	9
UTEP	1	–	7	2	–	10
Championship: Rice 41, Marshall 24
$ – Conference champion; x – Division champion/co-champions; Rankings from AP Poll

The 2013 Marshall Thundering Herd football team represented Marshall University in the 2013 NCAA Division I FBS football season. They were led by fourth-year head coach Doc Holliday and played their home games at Joan C. Edwards Stadium. They were a member of the East Division of Conference USA. They finished the season 10–4, 7–1 in C-USA play to win the East Division title. As East Division champions, they played West Division champions Rice in the C-USA Championship Game, losing to the Owls 24–41. They were invited to the Military Bowl where they defeated Maryland 31–20.

== Schedule ==
Date	Time	Opponent	Site	TV	Result	Attendance
August 31	7:00 pm	Miami (OH)*	Joan C. Edwards Stadium; Huntington, WV	CBSSN	W 52–14	27,148
September 7	6:30 pm	Gardner–Webb*	Joan C. Edwards Stadium; Huntington, WV		W 55–0	26,317
September 14	8:00 pm	at Ohio*	Peden Stadium; Athens, OH (Battle for the Bell)	ESPNews	L 31–34	24,836
September 21	12:00 pm	at Virginia Tech*	Lane Stadium; Blacksburg, VA	ESPNU	L 21–29 ^{3OT}	64,060
October 5	2:00 pm	UTSA^{†}	Joan C. Edwards Stadium; Huntington, WV	TW TX	W 34–10	28,837
October 12	5:00 pm	at Florida Atlantic	FAU Stadium; Boca Raton, FL	FCS	W 24–23	19,760
October 24	7:30 pm	at Middle Tennessee	Johnny "Red" Floyd Stadium; Murfreesboro, TN	FS1	L 49–51	19,898
November 2	12:00 pm	Southern Miss	Joan C. Edwards Stadium; Huntington, WV	CBSSN	W 61–13	20,398
November 9	12:00 pm	UAB	Joan C. Edwards Stadium; Huntington, WV	CSS	W 56–14	22,321
November 14	7:30 pm	at Tulsa	Skelly Field at H. A. Chapman Stadium; Tulsa, OK	FS1	W 45–34	16,723
November 23	6:00 pm	at FIU	FIU Stadium; Miami, FL	FCS	W 48–10	15,891
November 29	12:00 pm	East Carolina	Joan C. Edwards Stadium; Huntington, WV (rivalry)	CBSSN	W 59–28	25,117
December 7	12:00 pm	at Rice	Rice Stadium; Houston, TX (C-USA Championship)	ESPN2	L 24–41	20,247
December 27	2:30 pm	vs. Maryland*	Navy–Marine Corps Memorial Stadium; Annapolis, MD (Military Bowl)	ESPN	W 31–20	30,163
*Non-conference game; ^{†}Homecoming; All times are in Eastern time

== Game summaries ==
=== Miami (OH) ===
	1	2	3	4	Total
RedHawks	7	7	0	0	14
Thundering Herd	0	14	21	17	52

This was the 42nd time these two teams have faced each other, both in the Buckeye Conference (1933–1939) and in the Mid-American Conference (1953–1968; 1997–2004) over the years. Miami leads the overall win–loss record 29–11–1. The last times these two teams faced each other was in 2004, a 33–25 win over the RedHawks at the Joan C. Edwards Stadium.

=== Gardner-Webb ===
	1	2	3	4	Total
Runnin' Bulldogs	0	0	0	0	0
Thundering Herd	14	20	21	0	55

This was the first time these two teams had faced each other.

=== Ohio ===
	1	2	3	4	Total
Thundering Herd	7	3	7	14	31
Bobcats	7	10	7	10	34

This was the fifty seventh time these two teams had faced each other. Ohio leads the overall win–loss record 31–19–6. Previously, the last time these two teams faced each other was in 2012.

=== Virginia Tech ===
	1	2	3	4	OT	2OT	3OT	Total
Thundering Herd	7	14	0	0	0	0	0	21
Hokies	14	0	0	7	0	0	8	29

This will be the eleventh time these two teams have faced each other. Virginia Tech leads the overall win–loss record 8–2. The last times these two teams faced each other was in 2011.

=== UTSA ===
	1	2	3	4	Total
Roadrunners	0	3	0	7	10
Thundering Herd	17	7	0	10	34

This will be the first time these two schools have faced each other.

=== Florida Atlantic ===
	1	2	3	4	Total
Thundering Herd	0	7	7	10	24
Owls	0	3	13	7	23

This will be the first time these two teams have faced each other.

=== Middle Tennessee ===
	1	2	3	4	Total
Thundering Herd	7	14	14	14	49
Blue Raiders	14	7	17	13	51

This will be the third time these two teams have faced each other. Marshall leads the overall win–loss record 2–0. The last meeting between Marshall and Middle Tennessee was in 1994, when both schools were still in what was then known as Division I-AA (now FCS).

=== Southern Miss ===
	1	2	3	4	Total
Golden Eagles	0	10	3	0	13
Thundering Herd	28	7	13	13	61

This will be the ninth time these two teams have faced each other. Southern Miss leads the overall win–loss record 5–3. The last times these two teams faced each other was in 2012, when Southern Miss slipped from the Conference USA championship in 2011 to 0–12 last season. Marshall picked up its second win in Hattiesburg, Miss. at M. M. Roberts Stadium, 59–24.

=== UAB ===
	1	2	3	4	Total
Blazers	7	7	0	0	14
Thundering Herd	21	14	14	7	56

This will be the ninth time these two teams have faced each other. Marshall leads the overall win–loss record 6–2. The last times these two teams faced each other was in 2012, a 38–31 UAB win at Legion Field in Birmingham, Ala.

=== Tulsa ===
	1	2	3	4	Total
Thundering Herd	21	10	0	14	45
Golden Hurricane	0	14	17	3	34

This will be the fifth time these two teams have faced each other. Tulsa leads the overall win–loss record 4–0. The last times these two teams faced each other was in 2012, a 45–38 TU win at the Joan C. Edwards Stadium. Tulsa won Conference USA in 2012, and Marshall plays at TU for the second time in three seasons.

=== FIU ===
	1	2	3	4	Total
Thundering Herd	0	20	14	14	48
Panthers	3	0	0	7	10

This will be the second time these two teams have faced each other. Marshall leads the overall win–loss record 1–0. The last times these two teams faced each other was in 2011 in the Beef 'O'Brady's Bowl St. Petersburg (Fla.) at Tropicana Field, a 20–10 Thundering Herd win.

=== East Carolina ===
	1	2	3	4	Total
Pirates	0	10	10	8	28
Thundering Herd	17	7	21	14	59

This will be the fifteenth time these two teams have faced each other. East Carolina leads the overall win–loss record 10–4. The last time these two teams faced each other was in 2012.

=== Rice ===
	1	2	3	4	Total
Thundering Herd	0	10	0	14	24
Owls	14	7	13	7	41

This will be the fifth time these two teams have faced each other. Marshall lead the overall series 3–1. The last time these two teams faced each other was in 2012 at Houston. Marshall won that game 54–51 in double overtime.

=== Maryland–Military Bowl ===
	1	2	3	4	Total
Thundering Herd	14	3	0	14	31
Terrapins	7	6	0	7	20

This will be the first time these two teams have faced each other.
