= 2013 Tulsa Golden Hurricane football team =

American college football season

2013 Tulsa Golden Hurricane football
- Conference: Conference USA
- West Division
- Record: 3–9 (2–6 C-USA)
- Head coach: Bill Blankenship (3rd season)
- Offensive coordinator: Greg Peterson (3rd season)
- Defensive coordinator: Brent Guy (3rd season)
- Home stadium: Skelly Field at H. A. Chapman Stadium

2013 Conference USA football standings
	Conf.			Overall
Team	W		L	W		L
East Division
Marshall x	7	–	1	10	–	4
East Carolina	6	–	2	10	–	3
Middle Tennessee	6	–	2	8	–	5
Florida Atlantic	4	–	4	6	–	6
UAB	1	–	7	2	–	10
Southern Miss	1	–	7	1	–	11
FIU	1	–	7	1	–	11
West Division
Rice x$	7	–	1	10	–	4
UTSA	6	–	2	7	–	5
North Texas	6	–	2	9	–	4
Tulane	5	–	3	7	–	6
Louisiana Tech	3	–	5	4	–	8
Tulsa	2	–	6	3	–	9
UTEP	1	–	7	2	–	10
Championship: Rice 41, Marshall 24
$ – Conference champion; x – Division champion/co-champions; Rankings from AP Poll

The 2013 Tulsa Golden Hurricane football team represented the University of Tulsa in the 2013 NCAA Division I FBS football season. They were led by third-year head coach Bill Blankenship and played their home games at Skelly Field at H. A. Chapman Stadium. This was Tulsa's final season as a member of Conference USA (C-USA). Tulsa moved to the American Athletic Conference the following year. Tulsa had an overall record of 3–9 on the season with a 2–6 mark in conference to finish in sixth place in the C-USA West Division.

== Schedule ==
Date	Time	Opponent	Site	TV	Result	Attendance
August 29	6:00 p.m.	at Bowling Green*	Doyt Perry Stadium; Bowling Green, OH	ESPNU	L 7–34	18,142
September 7	6:00 p.m.	Colorado State*	Skelly Field at H. A. Chapman Stadium; Tulsa, OK	CBSSN	W 30–27	22,875
September 14	11:00 a.m.	at No. 14 Oklahoma*	Gaylord Family Oklahoma Memorial Stadium; Norman, OK	ESPN2	L 20–51	84,229
September 26	6:30 p.m.	Iowa State*	Skelly Field at H. A. Chapman Stadium; Tulsa, OK	FS1	L 21–38	20,137
October 5	2:30 p.m.	Rice	Skelly Field at H. A. Chapman Stadium; Tulsa, OK	CBSSN	L 27–30 ^{OT}	20,014
October 12	7:00 p.m.	at UTEP	Sun Bowl; El Paso, TX	FS1	W 34–20	22,158
October 26	2:30 p.m.	at Tulane	Mercedes-Benz Superdome; New Orleans, LA	CST	L 7–14	22,414
November 2	2:30 p.m.	UTSA	Skelly Field at H. A. Chapman Stadium; Tulsa, OK	CSS	L 15–34	21,815
November 9	2:45 p.m.	at East Carolina	Dowdy–Ficklen Stadium; Greenville, NC	FSN	L 24–58	44,076
November 14	6:30 p.m.	Marshall	Skelly Field at H. A. Chapman Stadium; Tulsa, OK	FS1	L 34–45	16,723
November 23	6:00 p.m.	at Louisiana Tech	Joe Aillet Stadium; Ruston, LA	CBSSN	W 24–14	16,037
November 30	1:30 p.m.	North Texas	Skelly Field at H. A. Chapman Stadium; Tulsa, OK	FSN	L 10–42	17,792
*Non-conference game; Rankings from AP Poll released prior to the game; All times are in Central time

== Game summaries ==
=== At Bowling Green ===
	1	2	3	4	Total
Golden Hurricane	0	0	0	7	7
Falcons	3	3	7	21	34

=== Colorado State ===
	1	2	3	4	Total
Rams	7	13	7	0	27
Golden Hurricane	14	0	3	13	30

=== At Oklahoma ===
	1	2	3	4	Total
Golden Hurricane	7	0	6	7	20
No. 14 Sooners	10	17	7	17	51

=== Iowa State ===
	1	2	3	4	Total
Cyclones	7	7	14	10	38
Golden Hurricane	0	14	0	7	21

=== Rice ===
	1	2	3	4	OT	Total
Owls	14	10	0	0	6	30
Golden Hurricane	10	0	3	11	3	27

=== At UTEP ===
	1	2	3	4	Total
Golden Hurricane	14	7	6	7	34
Miners	3	3	14	0	20

=== At Tulane ===
	1	2	3	4	Total
Golden Hurricane	0	7	0	0	7
Green Wave	0	7	7	0	14

=== UTSA ===
	1	2	3	4	Total
Roadrunners	14	10	0	10	34
Golden Hurricane	0	0	8	7	15

=== At East Carolina ===
	1	2	3	4	Total
Golden Hurricane	7	3	7	7	24
Pirates	7	14	14	23	58

=== Marshall ===
	1	2	3	4	Total
Thundering Herd	21	10	0	14	45
Golden Hurricane	0	14	17	3	34

=== At Louisiana Tech ===
	1	2	3	4	Total
Golden Hurricane	7	3	7	7	24
Bulldogs	0	7	7	0	14

=== North Texas ===
	1	2	3	4	Total
Mean Green	7	14	14	7	42
Golden Hurricane	10	0	0	0	10
