= 2013 Middle Tennessee Blue Raiders football team =

American college football season

2013 Middle Tennessee Blue Raiders football

Armed Forces Bowl, L 6–24 vs. Navy
- Conference: Conference USA
- East Division
- Record: 8–5 (6–2 C-USA)
- Head coach: Rick Stockstill (8th season)
- Offensive coordinator: Buster Faulkner (2nd season)
- Offensive scheme: Pro spread
- Co-defensive coordinators: Steve Ellis (3rd season); Tyrone Nix (2nd season)
- Base defense: 4–3
- Home stadium: Johnny "Red" Floyd Stadium

2013 Conference USA football standings
	Conf.			Overall
Team	W		L	W		L
East Division
Marshall x	7	–	1	10	–	4
East Carolina	6	–	2	10	–	3
Middle Tennessee	6	–	2	8	–	5
Florida Atlantic	4	–	4	6	–	6
UAB	1	–	7	2	–	10
Southern Miss	1	–	7	1	–	11
FIU	1	–	7	1	–	11
West Division
Rice x$	7	–	1	10	–	4
UTSA	6	–	2	7	–	5
North Texas	6	–	2	9	–	4
Tulane	5	–	3	7	–	6
Louisiana Tech	3	–	5	4	–	8
Tulsa	2	–	6	3	–	9
UTEP	1	–	7	2	–	10
Championship: Rice 41, Marshall 24
$ – Conference champion; x – Division champion/co-champions; Rankings from AP Poll

The 2013 Middle Tennessee Blue Raiders football team represented Middle Tennessee State University as a member of the East Division of Conference USA (C-USA) during the 2013 NCAA Division I FBS football season. Led by eighth-year head coach Rick Stockstill, the Blue Raiders compiled an overall record of 8–5 with a mark 6–2 in conference play to tie for second place in C-USA's East Division. Middle Tennessee was invited to the Armed Forces Bowl, where they lost to Navy. The team played home games at Johnny "Red" Floyd Stadium in Murfreesboro, Tennessee. This was Middle Tennessee first year as a member of C-USA after leaving the Sun Belt Conference.

== Schedule ==
Date	Time	Opponent	Site	TV	Result	Attendance
August 29	6:30 pm	Western Carolina*	Johnny "Red" Floyd Stadium; Murfreesboro, TN		W 45–24	20,011
September 7	11:30 am	at North Carolina*	Kenan Memorial Stadium; Chapel Hill, NC	ACCN	L 20–40	48,000
September 14	6:00 pm	Memphis*	Johnny "Red" Floyd Stadium; Murfreesboro, TN	CSS	W 17–15	23,992
September 21	11:00 am	at Florida Atlantic	FAU Stadium; Boca Raton, FL	CSS	W 42–35 ^{OT}	13,911
September 27	8:00 pm	at BYU*	LaVell Edwards Stadium; Provo, UT	ESPNU	L 10–37	58,763
October 5	2:30 pm	East Carolina^{†}	Johnny "Red" Floyd Stadium; Murfreesboro, TN	FSN	L 17–24	23,108
October 12	6:00 pm	at North Texas	Apogee Stadium; Denton, TX		L 7–34	21,171
October 24	6:30 pm	Marshall	Johnny "Red" Floyd Stadium; Murfreesboro, TN	FS1	W 51–49	19,898
November 2	12:00 pm	at UAB	Legion Field; Birmingham, AL	FSN	W 24–21	20,483
November 9	3:00 pm	FIU	Johnny "Red" Floyd Stadium; Murfreesboro, TN	FCS	W 48–0	16,717
November 23	2:30 pm	at Southern Miss	M. M. Roberts Stadium; Hattiesburg, MS	CSS	W 42–21	22,134
November 30	2:45 pm	UTEP	Johnny "Red" Floyd Stadium; Murfreesboro, TN	WUXP	W 48–17	11,560
December 30	10:45 am	vs. Navy*	Amon G. Carter Stadium; Fort Worth, TX (Armed Forces Bowl)	ESPN	L 6–24	39,246
*Non-conference game; ^{†}Homecoming; All times are in Central time

== Game summaries ==
=== Western Carolina ===
	1	2	3	4	Total
Catamounts	0	18	0	6	24
Blue Raiders	21	10	7	7	45

=== At North Carolina ===
	1	2	3	4	Total
Blue Raiders	0	0	7	13	20
Tar Heels	13	10	3	14	40

=== Memphis ===
	1	2	3	4	Total
Tigers	0	6	3	6	15
Blue Raiders	7	7	0	3	17

=== At Florida Atlantic ===
	1	2	3	4	OT	Total
Blue Raiders	7	7	7	14	7	42
Owls	0	7	14	14	0	35

=== At BYU ===
	1	2	3	4	Total
Blue Raiders	10	0	0	0	10
Cougars	7	16	14	0	37

=== East Carolina ===
	1	2	3	4	Total
Pirates	7	7	3	7	24
Blue Raiders	10	0	7	0	17

=== At North Texas ===
	1	2	3	4	Total
Blue Raiders	0	7	0	0	7
Mean Green	7	17	0	10	34

=== Marshall ===
	1	2	3	4	Total
Thundering Herd	7	14	14	14	49
Blue Raiders	14	7	17	13	51

=== At UAB ===
	1	2	3	4	Total
Blue Raiders	0	0	7	17	24
Blazers	7	0	3	11	21

=== FIU ===
	1	2	3	4	Total
Panthers	0	0	0	0	0
Blue Raiders	14	10	24	0	48

=== At Southern Miss ===
	1	2	3	4	Total
Blue Raiders	7	21	0	14	42
Golden Eagles	7	0	7	7	21

=== UTEP ===
	1	2	3	4	Total
Miners	0	7	10	0	17
Blue Raiders	17	17	14	0	48

=== Navy–Armed Forces Bowl ===
	1	2	3	4	Total
Blue Raiders	3	3	0	0	6
Midshipmen	7	3	0	14	24

== After the season ==
=== NFL draft ===
The following Blue Raider was selected in the 2014 NFL draft following the season.

Round	Pick	Player	Position	NFL club
5	172	Jimmy Staten	Defensive tackle	Seattle Seahawks
