= Lestar Jean =

American football player (born 1988)

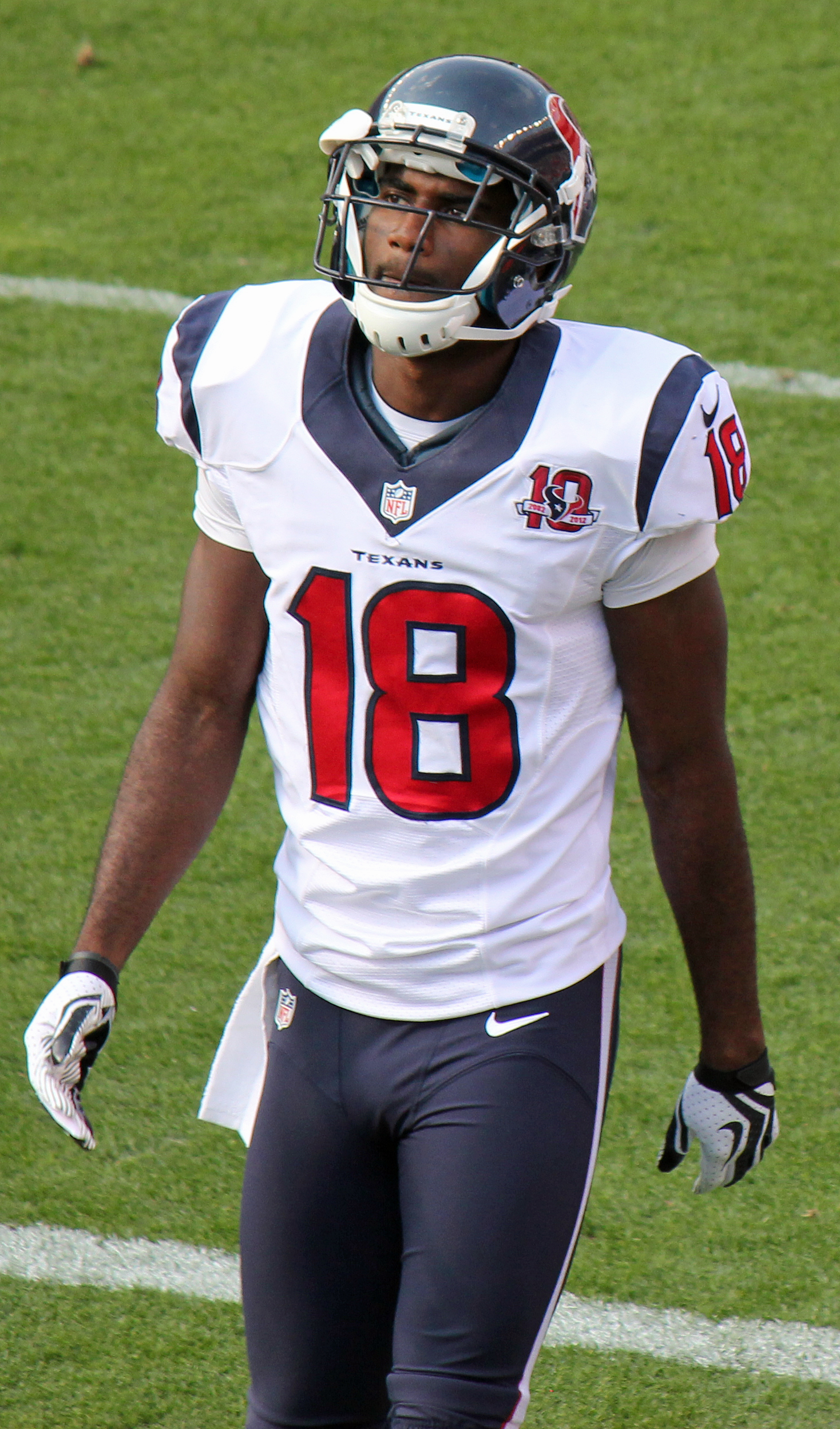
- Jean with the Houston Texans in 2012

No. 18
- Position: Wide receiver

Personal information
- Born: February 5, 1988 (age 38); Miami, Florida, U.S.
- Listed height: 6 ft 3 in (1.91 m)
- Listed weight: 212 lb (96 kg)

Career information
- High school: Miami Norland (Miami Gardens, Florida)
- College: Florida Atlantic (2007–2010)
- NFL draft: 2011: undrafted

Career history
- Houston Texans (2011–2013); Minnesota Vikings (2014)*; Orlando Predators (2016)*
- * Offseason or practice squad member only

Awards and highlights
- Second-team All-Sun Belt (2010)

Career NFL statistics
- Receptions: 10
- Receiving yards: 186
- Receiving touchdowns: 1
- Stats at Pro Football Reference

Lestar Jean (born February 5, 1988) is an American former professional football player who was a wide receiver in the National Football League (NFL). He has also played for the Minnesota Vikings and Houston Texans. He played college football for the Florida Atlantic Owls.

== Professional career ==
=== Houston Texans ===
Jean signed with the Houston Texans as an undrafted free agent after the 2011 NFL lockout concluded.

After spending the entire 2011 season on injured reserve due to a shoulder injury suffered in the preseason, Jean began the 2012 season as the team's fourth wide receiver. In week 13 against the Tennessee Titans, Jean caught a 54-yard pass from Matt Schaub for his first career touchdown. It was Jean's only reception of the game.

=== Minnesota Vikings ===
The Minnesota Vikings signed Jean on April 8, 2014.

=== Orlando Predators ===
On November 6, 2015, Jean was assigned to the Orlando Predators of the Arena Football League. On March 18, 2016, Jean was placed on recallable reassignment.
