= Jared Allen (quarterback) =

American football coach and former player (born 1981)

Biographical details
- Born: August 26, 1981 (age 45); Edmond, Oklahoma, U.S.

Playing career
- 2001–2004: Florida Atlantic
- 2006: Amsterdam Admirals
- Position: Quarterback

Coaching career (HC unless noted)
- 2009: Florida Atlantic (GA)
- 2010: Florida Atlantic (WR)
- 2011: Florida Atlantic (QB)
- 2012–2013: Florida Atlantic (TE)
- 2015–2016: Florida Atlantic (RB)

Administrative career (AD unless noted)
- 2014: Florida Atlantic (DPP, external relations)

Jared Allen (born August 26, 1981) is an American football coach and former player. He was the starting quarterback at Florida Atlantic University (FAU) from 2001 to 2004 and also played professionally for the Amsterdam Admirals of NFL Europe in 2006.

== Early life ==
Allen attended Edmond Santa Fe High School in Edmond, Oklahoma. As a senior, he completed 171 of 282 passes for 1,973 yards and 18 touchdowns. As a junior, he connected on 145 of 232 attempts for 1,502 yards and 9 touchdowns. He was named a 1999 Blue Chip athlete. He earned first-team All-Edmond Area, All-Metro Conference, All-District 6A-1, all-city (Oklahoma City) and Oklahoma Coaches Association all-state honors. Allen was named to the Jim Thorpe All-Star Game and was selected MVP. He was a two-sport athlete (football and basketball).

== College career ==
Allen started four years at Florida Atlantic University and was named the team's MVP in 2003, the offensive MVP in 2002, and the team MVP in 2001. He played in 47 games and started 44 times. Throughout his collegiate career, he completed 570 of 1,003 passes for 8,100 yards and 50 touchdowns. He was redshirted in 2000 and majored in political science.

== Professional career ==
=== 2005 season ===
Allen signed with the Tampa Bay Buccaneers as an undrafted free agent on May 5, 2005. He was released on August 31, 2005.

=== 2006 season ===
Allen was re-signed on January 5, 2006, and was allocated to the NFL Europe's Amsterdam Admirals. He shared backup quarterback duties with Reggie Robertson playing one quarter per game every other week, until starting quarterback Gibran Hamdan broke his ankle. Jared Allen was then granted the starting job, leading the Amsterdam Admirals to one win (away vs. the Frankfurt Galaxy) and two losses during the remaining regular season games. The one win was sufficient to secure first place in the season and a spot in the World Bowl, which was lost to the Frankfurt Galaxy by 7–22. Allen was released on August 29.

== Coaching career ==
In January, 2012 Allen was named the tight ends coach at Florida Atlantic University (FAU). After the 2013 season, Allen stepped back into an administrative role as director of player personnel and external relations. In 2015, he returned to a positional coach this time coaching running backs. Following the 2016 season, Allen stepped back from coaching for the 2017 season.
