= 2013 East Carolina Pirates football team =

American college football season

2013 East Carolina Pirates football

Beef 'O' Brady's Bowl champion

Beef 'O' Brady's Bowl, W 37–20 vs. Ohio
- Conference: Conference USA
- East Division
- Record: 10–3 (6–2 C-USA)
- Head coach: Ruffin McNeill (4th season)
- Offensive coordinator: Lincoln Riley (4th season)
- Offensive scheme: Air raid
- Defensive coordinator: Rick Smith (1st season)
- Base defense: 4–3
- Home stadium: Dowdy–Ficklen Stadium

2013 Conference USA football standings
	Conf.			Overall
Team	W		L	W		L
East Division
Marshall x	7	–	1	10	–	4
East Carolina	6	–	2	10	–	3
Middle Tennessee	6	–	2	8	–	5
Florida Atlantic	4	–	4	6	–	6
UAB	1	–	7	2	–	10
Southern Miss	1	–	7	1	–	11
FIU	1	–	7	1	–	11
West Division
Rice x$	7	–	1	10	–	4
UTSA	6	–	2	7	–	5
North Texas	6	–	2	9	–	4
Tulane	5	–	3	7	–	6
Louisiana Tech	3	–	5	4	–	8
Tulsa	2	–	6	3	–	9
UTEP	1	–	7	2	–	10
Championship: Rice 41, Marshall 24
$ – Conference champion; x – Division champion/co-champions; Rankings from AP Poll

The 2013 East Carolina Pirates football team represented East Carolina University in the 2013 NCAA Division I FBS football season. They were led by fourth-year head coach Ruffin McNeill and played their home games at Dowdy–Ficklen Stadium. They were a member of the East Division of Conference USA. This was their final season in C-USA before joining the American Athletic Conference in 2014.

== Schedule ==
Date	Time	Opponent	Site	TV	Result	Attendance
August 31	7:00 pm	Old Dominion*	Dowdy–Ficklen Stadium; Greenville, NC	FCS Atlantic	W 52–38	44,597
September 5	7:30 pm	Florida Atlantic	Dowdy–Ficklen Stadium; Greenville, NC	FS1	W 31–13	37,533
September 14	12:00 pm	Virginia Tech*	Dowdy–Ficklen Stadium; Greenville, NC	FS1	L 10–15	50,096
September 28	12:30 pm	at North Carolina*	Kenan Memorial Stadium; Chapel Hill, NC	ACCN	W 55–31	60,000
October 5	3:30 pm	at Middle Tennessee	Johnny "Red" Floyd Stadium; Murfreesboro, TN	FSN	W 24–17	20,109
October 12	3:30 pm	at Tulane	Mercedes-Benz Superdome; New Orleans, LA	WITN	L 33–36 ^{3OT}	15,157
October 19	12:00 pm	Southern Miss	Dowdy–Ficklen Stadium; Greenville, NC	FSN	W 55–14	45,005
November 2	6:00 pm	at FIU	FIU Stadium; Miami, FL	WITN	W 34–13	16,961
November 9	3:45 pm	Tulsa	Dowdy–Ficklen Stadium; Greenville, NC	FSN	W 58–24	44,076
November 16	1:00 pm	UAB	Dowdy–Ficklen Stadium; Greenville, NC	WITN	W 63–14	42,603
November 23	12:30 pm	at NC State*	Carter–Finley Stadium; Raleigh, NC (Victory Barrel)	ACCN	W 42–28	49,106
November 29	12:00 pm	at Marshall	Joan C. Edwards Stadium; Huntington, WV (rivalry)	CBSSN	L 28–59	25,117
December 23	2:00 pm	vs. Ohio*	Tropicana Field; St. Petersburg, FL (Beef 'O' Brady's Bowl)	ESPN	W 37–20	20,053
*Non-conference game; All times are in Eastern time

Schedule source:

== Game summaries ==
=== Old Dominion ===
	1	2	3	4	Total
Monarchs	3	14	14	7	38
Pirates	7	14	14	17	52

=== Florida Atlantic ===
	1	2	3	4	Total
Owls	3	3	0	7	13
Pirates	7	14	10	0	31

=== Virginia Tech ===
	1	2	3	4	Total
Hokies	7	0	6	2	15
Pirates	7	0	3	0	10

=== At North Carolina ===
	1	2	3	4	Total
Pirates	14	14	14	13	55
Tar Heels	0	10	14	7	31

=== At Middle Tennessee ===
	1	2	3	4	Total
Pirates	7	7	3	7	24
Blue Raiders	10	0	7	0	17

=== At Tulane ===
Team	1	2	3	4	OT	2OT	3OT	Total
Pirates	3	3	0	13	7	7	0	33
• Green Wave	3	3	10	3	7	7	3	36

- Location: New Orleans, LA
- Game start: 2:30 p.m. CDT
- Elapsed time: 3:54
- Game attendance: 15,157
- Game weather: Indoors
- Referee: James Jone
- Television network: WHNO

=== Southern Miss ===
	1	2	3	4	Total
Golden Eagles	0	0	0	14	14
Pirates	14	17	24	0	55

=== At FIU ===
	1	2	3	4	Total
Pirates	14	7	0	13	34
Panthers	3	7	3	0	13

=== Tulsa ===
	1	2	3	4	Total
Golden Hurricane	7	3	7	7	24
Pirates	7	14	14	23	58

=== UAB ===
	1	2	3	4	Total
Blazers	0	7	0	7	14
Pirates	14	21	14	14	63

=== At NC State ===
	1	2	3	4	Total
Pirates	7	14	14	7	42
Wolfpack	7	0	0	21	28

=== At Marshall ===
	1	2	3	4	Total
Pirates	0	10	10	8	28
Thundering Herd	17	7	21	14	59

This was the fifteenth time these two teams have faced each other. East Carolina leads the overall win–loss record 10–5.

=== Ohio–Beef 'O' Brady's Bowl ===
	1	2	3	4	Total
Bobcats	0	14	3	3	20
Pirates	14	3	0	20	37
