= 2013 Florida Atlantic Owls football team =

American college football season

2013 Florida Atlantic Owls football
- Conference: Conference USA
- East Division
- Record: 6–6 (4–4 C-USA)
- Head coach: Carl Pelini (2nd season; first 8 games); Brian Wright (interim; final 4 games)
- Offensive coordinator: Brian Wright (2nd season)
- Offensive scheme: Spread
- Defensive coordinator: Pete Rekstis (2nd season; first 8 games); Jovan Dewitt (interim; final 4 games)
- Base defense: 4–2–5
- Home stadium: FAU Stadium

2013 Conference USA football standings
	Conf.			Overall
Team	W		L	W		L
East Division
Marshall x	7	–	1	10	–	4
East Carolina	6	–	2	10	–	3
Middle Tennessee	6	–	2	8	–	5
Florida Atlantic	4	–	4	6	–	6
UAB	1	–	7	2	–	10
Southern Miss	1	–	7	1	–	11
FIU	1	–	7	1	–	11
West Division
Rice x$	7	–	1	10	–	4
UTSA	6	–	2	7	–	5
North Texas	6	–	2	9	–	4
Tulane	5	–	3	7	–	6
Louisiana Tech	3	–	5	4	–	8
Tulsa	2	–	6	3	–	9
UTEP	1	–	7	2	–	10
Championship: Rice 41, Marshall 24
$ – Conference champion; x – Division champion/co-champions; Rankings from AP Poll

The 2013 Florida Atlantic Owls football team represented Florida Atlantic University in the 2013 NCAA Division I FBS football season. The Owls were led by at the start of the season by second-year head coach Carl Pelini. However Pelini and defensive coordinator Rekstis resigned on October 30 after admitting they were at a local party where pot was served. Brian Wright was promoted and made interim head coach for the remainder of the season. The Owls played their home games at FAU Stadium. This season was the Owls' first as a member of Conference USA in the East Division.

== Schedule ==
Date	Time	Opponent	Site	TV	Result	Attendance
August 30	8:00 p.m.	at Miami (FL)*	Sun Life Stadium; Miami Gardens, FL	ESPNU	L 6–34	50,151
September 5	7:30 p.m.	at East Carolina	Dowdy–Ficklen Stadium; Greenville, NC	FS1	L 13–31	37,533
September 14	7:00 p.m.	at South Florida*	Raymond James Stadium; Tampa, FL (rivalry)	ESPN3	W 28–10	33,792
September 21	12:00 p.m.	Middle Tennessee	FAU Stadium; Boca Raton, FL	CSS	L 35–42 ^{OT}	13,911
September 28	7:00 p.m.	at Rice	Rice Stadium; Houston, TX	FCS	L 14–18	14,380
October 5	3:00 p.m.	at UAB	Legion Field; Birmingham, AL		W 37–23	11,319
October 12	5:00 p.m.	Marshall	FAU Stadium; Boca Raton, FL	FCS	L 23–24	19,760
October 26	7:30 p.m.	at No. 11 Auburn*	Jordan–Hare Stadium; Auburn, AL	SECRN	L 10–45	85,517
November 2	5:00 p.m.	Tulane	FAU Stadium; Boca Raton, FL		W 34–17	16,406
November 16	12:30 p.m.	at Southern Miss	M. M. Roberts Stadium; Hattiesburg, MS	CSS	W 41–7	20,802
November 23	3:00 p.m.	New Mexico State*	FAU Stadium; Boca Raton, FL		W 55–10	12,253
November 29	3:00 p.m.	FIU	FAU Stadium; Boca Raton, FL (Shula Bowl)	FS1	W 21–6	10,428
*Non-conference game; Rankings from AP Poll released prior to the game; All times are in Eastern time

== Awards and honors ==
=== Mid-season awards and honors ===
- Week 3 Conference USA Player of the Week, Defense: D'Joun Smith (DB, Jr.)
- Week 6 Conference USA Player of the Week, Offense: Jaquez Johnson (QB, Jr.)
- Week 10 Conference USA Player of the Week, Defense: D'Joun Smith (DB, Jr.)
- Week 12 Conference USA Player of the Week, Defense: Christian Milstead (DB, Jr.)

=== Post-season awards and honors ===
- Conference USA Newcomer of the Year: Jaquez Johnson (QB, Jr.)

=== All-Conference USA honors ===
- First Team All-Conference USA:
  - Cory Henry (DL, Sr.)
  - D'Joun Smith (DB, Jr.)
- Second Team All-Conference USA:
  - Andrae Kirk (LB, Jr.)
  - Sean Kelly (P, So.)
