= Carl Pelini =

American football player and coach (born 1965)

Biographical details
- Born: July 15, 1965 (age 61); Youngstown, Ohio, U.S.

Playing career
- 1983–1984: Columbia
- Position: Linebacker

Coaching career (HC unless noted)
- 1987–1988: Cardinal Mooney HS (OH) (assistant)
- 1989–1990: Kansas State (GA)
- 1991: Kansas State (REC)
- 1993–1994: Blue Valley HS (KS) (DC)
- 1995–1999: Winnetonka HS (MO)
- 2000–2002: Austintown Fitch HS (OH)
- 2003: Nebraska (GA)
- 2004: Minnesota State (DC/DB)
- 2005–2007: Ohio (DL)
- 2008–2011: Nebraska (DC/DL)
- 2012–2013: Florida Atlantic
- 2015–2017: Youngstown State (DC/LB)
- 2018: Bowling Green (DC / interim HC)
- 2019: Youngstown State (DC)
- 2020–2024: Cardinal Mooney HS (OH)

Administrative career (AD unless noted)
- 1995–1999: Winnetonka HS (MO)

Head coaching record
- Overall: 6–17 (college)

Accomplishments and honors

Awards
- Suburban Conference Coach of the Year (1997)

Carl Anthony Pelini (born July 15, 1965) is an American football coach. He served as defensive coordinator at Youngstown State University for the 2019 season. Pelini previously served as the head coach of Florida Atlantic from 2012 to 2013. He is the older brother of Bo Pelini, the former head coach at Nebraska and Youngstown State as well as defensive coordinator at LSU.

== Early life ==
Pelini was born in Youngstown, Ohio, a former center of steel production with a strong athletic tradition, and graduated from Youngstown Cardinal Mooney High School (the same high school as former Oklahoma head coach Bob Stoops, Kentucky head coach Mark Stoops, and brother Bo Pelini, former head coach at Nebraska).

== Playing career ==
Pelini had a relatively short playing career, putting in just two seasons at Columbia University in New York City in 1983 and 1984 as a middle linebacker before returning home to finish his degree.

== Coaching career ==
Prior to finishing his first degree, Pelini began his coaching career with a two-year stint beginning in 1987 as an assistant at his alma mater, Cardinal Mooney High School in Youngstown.

The following year, 1989, Pelini completed his bachelor's degree in English literature from Youngstown State University, and later in the same year was brought aboard the staff at Kansas State University by Bill Snyder as a graduate assistant. Two years later he moved up from Graduate Assistant to a position on staff as a Restricted Earnings Coach, while he simultaneously completed his master's degree in journalism at Kansas State.

Pelini then spent two years out of coaching while finishing his third degree, a master's in education, from Ohio State University in 1993, and then promptly returned to the coaching ranks as the defensive coordinator for Blue Valley High School in Overland Park, Kansas, for the 1993 and 1994 seasons.

In 1995, Pelini was appointed as a head coach for the first time, while also assuming the role of athletic director, at Winnetonka High School in Kansas City, Missouri. During his four-year tenure at Winnetonka, he orchestrated a remarkable turnaround for a program that had achieved a winning season only once in the previous 11 years, and his 1997 squad finished 8–2 and led to Pelini being named Suburban Conference Coach of the Year. Pelini spent five seasons at Winnetonka, with an overall record of 18–32.

In 2000, Pelini was tapped to revitalize a high school program and welcomed the opportunity to return to his roots for a short time when he was hired as Head Coach at Austintown-Fitch High School in Austintown, Ohio, a suburb of his hometown of Youngstown. Pelini started the resurrection of a program that had gone without a winning season in the previous five years. Today, Austintown-Fitch High School boasts a top high school program in Northeast Ohio.

Pelini moved back into the college ranks, again as a graduate assistant, when hired by Frank Solich at Nebraska, where he worked side by side with younger brother Bo Pelini who had also just been hired by Solich as defensive coordinator. At the conclusion of the regular season, despite posting a 9–3 record, Solich was fired by new Nebraska athletic director Steve Pederson. Bo Pelini was named the interim head coach and with the rest of the coaching staff still on board led the Cornhuskers to a 17–3 win over the Michigan State Spartans in the 2003 Alamo Bowl. Bo Pelini interviewed for the Nebraska head coach position, but Pederson instead decided after a 41-day search to hire Bill Callahan, the recently fired coach of the Oakland Raiders. Both Pelini brothers departed Nebraska.

Jeff Jamrog, another Nebraska assistant let go following the dismissal of Frank Solich, was hired as head coach at Minnesota State University, Mankato for the 2004 season. Jamrog brought Pelini over as well, hiring him as defensive coordinator and defensive backs coach. Minnesota State Mankato finished 6–5 that year, a major improvement over their winless season the year prior.

The following year, in 2005, after taking a year off to study the game, Frank Solich rejoined the ranks of head coaches when he was hired at Ohio to turn the Bobcat program around, and Pelini accepted a position under his former boss at Ohio, as Defensive Line Coach. 2006 was the year of resurgence for the long-suffering Ohio program, as they finished with nine wins and won the East Division Mid-American Conference title. The 2006 Bobcats also played in the GMAC Bowl against Southern Miss, Ohio's first bowl appearance since 1968.

At the conclusion of the 2007 season, a coaching change again influenced Pelini's career. Bill Callahan, Frank Solich's successor at Nebraska, was fired after four seasons. Pelini's brother Bo was named Callahan's successor and brought Pelini with him upon his return. Pelini returned to Nebraska, this time in the role of Defensive Coordinator and Defensive Line Coach.

In 2010, following a heated loss at Texas A&M that included fans storming the field, Pelini was accused by TexAgs co-owner Brandon Jones, who was on the field as a credentialed media member, of grabbing and damaging his camera. Pelini initially denied the accusations, but after video evidence from Jones' camera and another camera in the stands showed him lunging towards Jones and grabbing the camera unprovoked, he apologized and offered to pay to fix any damage done to the camera.

On December 1, 2011, Pelini became the head football coach at Florida Atlantic University.

He resigned on October 30, 2013, after FAU athletic director Pat Chun confronted Pelini and defensive coordinator Pete Rekstis with reports of illegal drug use. He resigned with a 5–15 record.

Chun told the Sun Sentinel, “They admitted to wrongdoings and they resigned on the spot."

Chun said he was approached by two unnamed people, both of whom said they had evidence of drug use by the coaches. Chun and assistant athletic director Melissa Dawson investigated the incident and found more evidence implicating the two coaches.

Later, Carl Pelini filed a Defamation of Character lawsuit against Florida Atlantic University claiming that Florida Atlantic had him under duress and made false statements against him.

On March 2, 2015, he was hired by his brother, Bo, as an assistant defensive coach at Youngstown State University.

On December 18, 2017, sources from the Toledo Blade confirmed that Pelini was to be named the defensive coordinator at Bowling Green State University.

On October 14, 2018, Pelini was named interim head coach of Bowling Green after the school fired Mike Jinks.

After spending 2019 as the defensive coordinator at Youngstown State University, on July 27, 2020, he was named head coach at his alma mater, Cardinal Mooney High School.

On August 30, 2021, an arrest warrant was issued for Pelini after an alleged domestic violence incident at his house in Youngstown. Subsequently, Cardinal Mooney placed him on administrative leave.

== Head coaching record ==
=== College ===
| Year | Team | Overall | Conference | Standing |
|---|---|---|---|---|
Florida Atlantic Owls (Sun Belt Conference) (2012)
| 2012 | Florida Atlantic | 3–9 | 2–6 | T–8th |
Florida Atlantic Owls (Conference USA) (2013)
| 2013 | Florida Atlantic | 2–6 (Note: Pelini served as Florida Atlantic's head coach for the first eight games of the 2013 season before resigning. Brian Wright was appointed interim head coach and led the team for the final four games of the season. Florida Atlantic finished the year with an overall record of 6–6 overall and a mark of 4–4 in conference play, placing fourth in the East Division of Conference USA.) | 1–4 | |
| Florida Atlantic: | | 5–15 | 3–10 | |
Bowling Green Falcons (Mid-American Conference) (2018)
| 2018 | Bowling Green | 2–3 (Note: Mike Jinks served as Bowling Green's head coach for the first seven games of the 2018 season before he was fired. Pelini was appointed interim head coach and led the team for the final five games of the season. Bowling Green finished the year with an overall record of 3–9 and a mark of 2–6 in conference play.) | 2–3 | T–4th (East) |
| Bowling Green: | | 2–3 | 2–3 | |
| Total: | | 7–18 | | |
