= 2009 Florida Atlantic Owls football team =

American college football season

2009 Florida Atlantic Owls football
- Conference: Sun Belt Conference
- Record: 5–7 (5–3 Sun Belt)
- Head coach: Howard Schnellenberger (9th season)
- Offensive coordinator: Daryl Jackson (1st season)
- Offensive scheme: Pro-style
- Defensive coordinator: Kirk Hoza (9th season)
- Base defense: 4–3
- Home stadium: Lockhart Stadium

2009 Sun Belt Conference football standings
	Conf.			Overall
Team	W		L	W		L
Troy $	8	–	0	9	–	4
Middle Tennessee	7	–	1	10	–	3
Louisiana–Monroe	5	–	3	6	–	6
Florida Atlantic	5	–	3	5	–	7
Louisiana–Lafayette	4	–	4	6	–	6
Arkansas State	3	–	5	4	–	8
FIU	3	–	5	3	–	9
North Texas	1	–	7	2	–	10
Western Kentucky	0	–	8	0	–	12
$ – Conference champion

The 2009 Florida Atlantic Owls football team represented Florida Atlantic University (FAU) as a member of the Sun Belt Conference during the 2009 NCAA Division I FBS football season. Led by ninth-year head coach Howard Schnellenberger, the Owls compiled an overall record of 5–7 with a mark of 5–3 in conference play, tying for third place in the Sun Belt. The team played home games at Lockhart Stadium in Fort Lauderdale, Florida.

== Schedule ==
Date	Time	Opponent	Site	TV	Result	Attendance	Source
September 5	7:00 p.m.	at No. 22 Nebraska*	Memorial Stadium; Lincoln, NE	PPV	L 3–49	85,719	
September 19	7:00 p.m.	at South Carolina*	Williams–Brice Stadium; Columbia, SC	PPV	L 16–38	72,017	
September 26	4:00 p.m.	Louisiana–Monroe	Lockhart Stadium; Fort Lauderdale, FL		L 25–27	14,429	
October 3	4:00 p.m.	Wyoming*	Lockhart Stadium; Fort Lauderdale, FL		L 28–30	15,744	
October 17	7:00 p.m.	at North Texas	Fouts Field; Denton, TX	CSS	W 44–40	23,319	
October 24	5:00 p.m.	at Louisiana–Lafayette	Cajun Field; Lafayette, LA		W 51–29	21,135	
October 31	4:00 p.m.	Middle Tennessee	Lockhart Stadium; Fort Lauderdale, FL		L 20–27	15,568	
November 7	2:00 p.m.	at UAB*	Legion Field; Birmingham, AL		L 29–56	17,283	
November 14	4:00 p.m.	Arkansas State	Lockhart Stadium; Fort Lauderdale, FL		W 35–18	16,218	
November 21	3:15 p.m.	at Troy	Movie Gallery Stadium; Troy, AL	CSS	L 21–47	16,638	
November 28	4:00 p.m.	Western Kentucky	Lockhart Stadium; Fort Lauderdale, FL		W 29–23	14,671	
December 5	7:00 p.m.	at FIU	FIU Stadium; Miami, FL (Shula Bowl)	CSS	W 28–21	10,108	
*Non-conference game; Rankings from AP Poll released prior to the game; All times are in Eastern time

== Preseason ==
The Florida Atlantic Owls entered the 2009 season hoping to rebound on what was considered a disappointing 2008 campaign. The 2008 team ended the season 7–6 overall and 4–3 in conference, despite returning an overwhelming majority of starters from the 2007 conference championship team. Quarterback Rusty Smith entered his senior season. The 2009 team looked to rebuild on defense, losing defensive star, Frantz Joseph, and a number of other key starters. The Owls also had a new offensive system, as Gary Nord, offensive coordinator for Florida Atlantic since 2005, took the same job at Purdue University.

=== Preseason honors ===
==== Preseason Sun Belt Players of the Year ====
- Sun Belt Conference Co-Player of the Year, Offense: Rusty Smith (QB, Sr.)

==== Preseason All-Sun Belt honors ====
- Rusty Smith (QB, Sr.)
- Jamari Grant (TE, Sr.)

== Awards and honors ==
- Week 15 Sun Belt Conference Player of the Week, Offense: Alfred Morris (RB, So.)
- 2009 Shula Bowl Most Valuable Player: Alfred Morris (RB, So.)

=== All-Sun Belt honors ===
- First Team All-Sun Belt Conference:
  - Jason Harmon (TE, Sr.)
  - Alfred Morris (RB, So.)
- Second Team All-Sun Belt Conference:
  - David Matlock (OL, Sr.)
- Honorable Mention All-Sun Belt Conference:
  - Marcus Bartels (DB, So.)
  - Kevin Cyrille (DL, So.)

== New program records ==
Alfred Morris broke several program records during the 2009 season.

Statistic	Previous record	New record
Rushing yards in a season	Charles Pierre (1,014 in 2008)	Alfred Morris (1,392)
Rushing touchdowns in a season	Doug Parker (8 in 2001)	Alfred Morris (11)
Total touchdowns in a season	Doug Parker (9 in 2001)	Alfred Morris (13)
