= 2002 Florida Atlantic Owls football team =

American college football season

2002 Florida Atlantic Owls football
- Conference: Independent
- Record: 2–9
- Head coach: Howard Schnellenberger (2nd season)
- Offensive coordinator: Larry Seiple (2nd season)
- Offensive scheme: Pro-style
- Defensive coordinator: Kirk Hoza (2nd season)
- Base defense: 4–3
- Home stadium: Pro Player Stadium

2002 NCAA Division I-AA independents football standings
	Conf.			Overall
Team	W		L	W		L
Saint Mary's		–		6	–	6
FIU		–		5	–	6
Samford		–		4	–	7
Cal Poly		–		3	–	8
Florida Atlantic		–		2	–	9
Savannah State		–		1	–	8
Southern Utah		–		1	–	10
Morris Brown		–		1	–	11

The 2002 Florida Atlantic Owls football team represented Florida Atlantic University (FAU) as an independent during the 2002 NCAA Division I-AA football season. Led by second-year head coach Howard Schnellenberger, the Owls compiled a record of 2–9. Florida Atlantic played home games at Pro Player Stadium in Miami Gardens, Florida.

== Schedule ==
Date	Time	Opponent	Site	Result	Attendance	Source
August 29	7:00 p.m.	at South Florida	Raymond James Stadium; Tampa, FL (rivalry)	L 10–51	22,074	
September 7		Bethune–Cookman	Pro Player Stadium; Miami Gardens, FL	L 17–30	7,987	
September 14		at James Madison	Bridgeforth Stadium; Harrisburg, VA	L 13–16	7,982	
September 21		at No. 21 Eastern Kentucky	Roy Kidd Stadium; Richmond, KY	L 6–22	9,400	
October 5	4:30 p.m.	at No. 24 Nicholls State	John L. Guidry Stadium; Thibodaux, LA	L 22–33	2,811	
October 12		No. 22 Youngstown State	Pro Player Stadium; Miami Gardens, FL	L 17–24	6,781	
October 26		at Troy State	Veterans Memorial Stadium; Troy, AL	L 6–21	12,465	
November 2	12:00 p.m.	at Connecticut	Memorial Stadium; Storrs, CT	L 14–61	14,287	
November 9		Morris Brown	Pro Player Stadium; Miami Gardens, FL	W 34–13	5,965	
November 16		at No. 3 Eastern Illinois	O'Brien Field; Charleston, IL	L 6–47	3,640	
November 23		FIU	Pro Player Stadium; Miami Gardens, FL (Shula Bowl)	W 31–21	10,224	
Rankings from The Sports Network Poll released prior to the game; All times are in Eastern time
