= 2012 Florida Atlantic Owls football team =

American college football season

2012 Florida Atlantic Owls football
- Conference: Sun Belt Conference
- Record: 3–9 (2–6 Sun Belt)
- Head coach: Carl Pelini (1st season)
- Offensive coordinator: Brian Wright (1st season)
- Offensive scheme: Spread
- Defensive coordinator: Pete Rekstis (1st season)
- Base defense: 4–2–5
- Home stadium: FAU Stadium

2012 Sun Belt Conference football standings
	Conf.			Overall
Team	W		L	W		L
Arkansas State $	7	–	1	10	–	3
Louisiana–Monroe	6	–	2	8	–	5
Middle Tennessee	6	–	2	8	–	4
Louisiana–Lafayette *	4	–	2	5	–	4
Western Kentucky	4	–	4	7	–	6
Troy	3	–	5	5	–	7
North Texas	3	–	5	4	–	8
Florida Atlantic	2	–	6	3	–	9
FIU	2	–	6	3	–	9
South Alabama **	1	–	7	2	–	11
$ – Conference champion; * – Louisiana–Lafayette vacated 4 wins due to NCAA violations. ** – South Alabama was ineligible for the conference title or a bowl game as part of their transition to the FBS.

The 2012 Florida Atlantic Owls football team represented Florida Atlantic University in the 2012 NCAA Division I FBS football season. They were led by first-year head coach Carl Pelini and played their home games at FAU Stadium. They were a member of the Sun Belt Conference. They finished the season 3–9, 2–6 in Sun Belt play to finish in a tie for eighth place.

== Schedule ==
Date	Time	Opponent	Site	TV	Result	Attendance
August 31	8:00 p.m.	Wagner*	FAU Stadium; Boca Raton, FL	ESPN3	W 7–3	14,510
September 8	7:00 p.m.	at Middle Tennessee	Johnny "Red" Floyd Stadium; Murfreesboro, TN	ESPN3	L 17–31	16,227
September 15	7:30 p.m.	at No. 7 Georgia*	Sanford Stadium; Athens, GA	CSS	L 20–56	92,746
September 22	5:00 p.m.	at No. 1 Alabama*	Bryant–Denny Stadium; Tuscaloosa, AL	PPV	L 7–40	101,821
September 29	5:00 p.m.	North Texas	FAU Stadium; Boca Raton, FL	ESPN3	L 14–20	13,888
October 13	7:00 p.m.	at Louisiana–Monroe	Malone Stadium; Monroe, LA	SBN/CSS	L 14–35	16,782
October 20	3:30 p.m.	at South Alabama	Ladd-Peebles Stadium; Mobile, AL		L 34–37 ^{2OT}	17,566
October 27	5:00 p.m.	Troy	FAU Stadium; Boca Raton, FL		W 34–27	11,968
November 3	3:30 p.m.	at Navy*	Navy–Marine Corps Memorial Stadium; Annapolis, MD	CBSSN	L 17–24	29,326
November 10	12:00 p.m.	at Western Kentucky	Houchens Industries–L. T. Smith Stadium; Bowling Green, KY	SBN/CSS	W 37–28	14,185
November 16	8:00 p.m.	FIU	FAU Stadium; Boca Raton, FL (Shula Bowl)	ESPNU	L 24–34	15,405
December 1	3:00 p.m.	Louisiana–Lafayette	FAU Stadium; Boca Raton, FL		L 21–35	11,522
*Non-conference game; Rankings from Coaches' Poll released prior to the game; All times are in Eastern time

- Source: Schedule

== Game summaries ==
=== Wagner ===
	1	2	3	4	Total
Seahawks	0	3	0	0	3
Owls	0	0	0	7	7

=== Middle Tennessee ===
	1	2	3	4	Total
Owls	0	0	3	14	17
Blue Raiders	0	7	17	7	31

=== Georgia ===
	1	2	3	4	Total
Owls	7	7	0	6	20
#7 Bulldogs	14	14	21	7	56

=== Alabama ===
	1	2	3	4	Total
Owls	0	0	0	7	7
#1 Crimson Tide	14	16	3	7	40

=== North Texas ===
	1	2	3	4	Total
Mean Green	7	3	7	3	20
Owls	0	0	7	7	14

=== Louisiana–Monroe ===
	1	2	3	4	Total
Owls	7	0	7	0	14
Warhawks	7	14	7	7	35

=== South Alabama ===
	1	2	3	4	OT	2OT	Total
Owls	14	3	7	7	3	0	34
Jaguars	7	7	3	14	3	3	37

=== Troy ===
	1	2	3	4	Total
Trojans	0	17	0	10	27
Owls	14	3	9	8	34

=== Navy ===
	1	2	3	4	Total
Owls	0	10	0	7	17
Midshipmen	0	14	10	0	24

=== Western Kentucky ===
	1	2	3	4	Total
Owls	0	14	7	16	37
Hilltoppers	7	7	0	14	28

=== FIU ===
	1	2	3	4	Total
Panthers	7	7	13	7	34
Owls	0	10	7	7	24

The Owls were defeated by FIU in the Shula Bowl.

=== Louisiana–Lafayette ===
	1	2	3	4	Total
Ragin' Cajuns	7	14	7	7	35
Owls	14	0	0	7	21
