= Jason Harmon =

American gridiron football player (born 1987)

No. 11
- Position: Wide receiver

Personal information
- Born: January 27, 1987 (age 39); Newport News, Virginia, U.S.
- Listed height: 6 ft 2 in (1.88 m)
- Listed weight: 214 lb (97 kg)

Career information
- High school: Riverview (Riverview, Florida)
- College: Florida Atlantic
- NFL draft: 2010: undrafted

Career history
- Jacksonville Jaguars (2010); Toronto Argonauts (2011)*; Lakeland/Florida Marine Raiders (2013–2014)
- * Offseason or practice squad member only

Awards and highlights
- 2× First-team All-Sun Belt (2007, 2009)

Jason Harmon (born January 27, 1987) is a former professional football wide receiver. He played college football at Florida Atlantic.

== Professional career ==
=== Jacksonville Jaguars ===
Harmon was signed as an undrafted free agent by the Jacksonville Jaguars after the 2010 NFL draft. Harmon was waived/injured on August 5, 2010.

=== Toronto Argonauts ===
On June 1, 2011, Harmon signed with the Toronto Argonauts of the Canadian Football League. He was assigned to the team's practice roster on June 24, 2011, but was released from the practice roster on July 4, 2011.

=== Lakeland/Florida Marine Raiders ===
In 2013 and 2014, Harmon played as a member of the Lakeland/Florida Marine Raiders.
