= LaJohntay Wester =

American football player (born 2002)

No. 10 – Baltimore Ravens
- Positions: Wide receiver, return specialist
- Roster status: Active

Personal information
- Born: March 29, 2002 (age 24); Palmetto, Florida, U.S.
- Listed height: 5 ft 9 in (1.75 m)
- Listed weight: 180 lb (82 kg)

Career information
- High school: Palmetto
- College: Florida Atlantic (2020–2023); Colorado (2024)
- NFL draft: 2025: 6th round, 203rd overall pick

Career history
- Baltimore Ravens (2025–present)

Awards and highlights
- First-team All-American (2023); AAC Special Teams Player of the Year (2023); First-team All-AAC (2023)

Career NFL statistics as of Week 9, 2026
- Receptions: 5
- Receiving yards: 58
- Return yards: 916
- Stats at Pro Football Reference

LaJohntay Wester (born March 29, 2002) is an American professional football wide receiver and return specialist for the Baltimore Ravens of the National Football League (NFL). He played college football for the Florida Atlantic Owls and Colorado Buffaloes. Wester was selected by the Ravens in the sixth round of the 2025 NFL draft.

== Early life ==
Wester attended Palmetto High School in Palmetto, Florida. As a senior, Wester hauled in 35 receptions for 758 yards and eight touchdowns before committing to play college football at Florida Atlantic University.

== College career ==
=== FAU ===
During his freshman season in 2020, Wester recorded 17 catches for 114 yards and a touchdown. He followed that up the next season, tallying 65 receptions for 702 yards and four touchdowns. In 2023, Wester became the school's all-time leading receiver. He finished the season with 108 receptions for 1,168 yards and eight touchdowns, being named to the First-team All-AAC, and being named the AAC special teams player of the year. He was also named a First-team All-American as a punt returner. On December 15, 2023, Wester entered the transfer portal.

=== Colorado ===
On January 10, 2024, Wester announced that he would be transferring to the University of Colorado Boulder to play for the Colorado Buffaloes. On September 21, 2024, Wester caught a 43-yard Hail Mary pass from Shedeur Sanders as time expired, to force overtime against Baylor, a game in which the Buffaloes won 38-31.

=== Statistics ===
Year	Team	Games		Receiving				Rushing				Punt returns				Kick returns			
Year	Team	GP	GS	Rec	Yds	Avg	TD	Att	Yds	Avg	TD	Ret	Yds	Avg	TD	Ret	Yds	Avg	TD
2020	Florida Atlantic	9	1	17	114	6.7	1	8	34	4.3	0	10	89	8.9	0	12	260	21.7	0
2021	Florida Atlantic	12	9	65	702	10.8	4	5	29	5.8	0	19	129	6.8	0	0	0	0.0	0
2022	Florida Atlantic	12	11	62	719	11.6	8	15	106	7.1	1	14	136	9.7	0	0	0	0.0	0
2023	Florida Atlantic	12	12	108	1,168	10.8	8	8	44	5.5	1	14	278	19.9	1	2	30	15.0	0
2024	Colorado	13	12	74	931	12.6	10	1	0	0.0	0	9	108	12.0	1	1	14	14.0	0
Career		58	45	326	3,634	11.1	31	37	213	5.8	2	66	740	11.2	2	15	304	20.3	0

== Professional career ==
Pre-draft measurables
Height	Weight	Arm length	Hand span	Wingspan	40-yard dash	10-yard split	20-yard split	20-yard shuttle	Three-cone drill	Vertical jump	Broad jump
5 ft 9 5/8 in (1.77 m)	163 lb (74 kg)	29 3/4 in (0.76 m)	8 5/8 in (0.22 m)	6 ft 0 5/8 in (1.84 m)	4.46 s	1.53 s	2.59 s	4.50 s	7.25 s	32.0 in (0.81 m)	10 ft 1 in (3.07 m)
All values from NFL Combine/Pro Day

=== Baltimore Ravens ===
Wester was selected by the Baltimore Ravens with the 203rd overall pick in the sixth round of the 2025 NFL draft.

== NFL career statistics ==
=== Regular season ===
Year	Team	Games		Punt returns					Kick returns					Fumbles	
Year	Team	GP	GS	Ret	Yds	Avg	Lng	TD	Ret	Yds	Avg	Lng	TD	Fum	Lost
2025	BAL	17	0	16	198	12.4	35	0	10	246	24.6	32	0	2	1
Career		25	0	28	301	24.4	86	0	22	246	24.6	32	0	2	1
