= 2010 Florida Atlantic Owls football team =

American college football season

2010 Florida Atlantic Owls football
- Conference: Sun Belt Conference
- Record: 4–8 (3–5 Sun Belt)
- Head coach: Howard Schnellenberger (10th season)
- Offensive coordinator: Daryl Jackson (2nd season)
- Offensive scheme: Pro-style
- Defensive coordinator: Kurt Van Valkenburgh (1st season)
- Base defense: 4–3
- Home stadium: Lockhart Stadium

2010 Sun Belt Conference football standings
	Conf.			Overall
Team	W		L	W		L
Troy +	6	–	2	8	–	5
FIU +	6	–	2	7	–	6
Middle Tennessee	5	–	3	6	–	7
Louisiana–Monroe	4	–	4	5	–	7
Arkansas State	4	–	4	4	–	8
Florida Atlantic	3	–	5	4	–	8
Louisiana–Lafayette	3	–	5	3	–	9
North Texas	3	–	5	3	–	9
Western Kentucky	2	–	6	2	–	10
+ – Conference co-champions

The 2010 Florida Atlantic Owls football team represented Florida Atlantic University (FAU) as a member of the Sun Belt Conference during the 2010 NCAA Division I FBS football season. Led by tenth-year head coach Howard Schnellenberger, the Owls compiled an overall record of 4–8 with a mark of 3–5 in conference play, tying for sixth place in the Sun Belt. The team played home games at Lockhart Stadium in Fort Lauderdale, Florida.

== Schedule ==
Date	Time	Opponent	Site	TV	Result	Attendance	Source
September 4	8:00 p.m.	at UAB*	Legion Field; Birmingham, AL		W 32–31	25,885	
September 11	12:00 p.m.	vs. Michigan State*	Ford Field; Detroit, MI	ESPNU	L 17–30	36,124	
September 25	7:00 p.m.	North Texas	Lockhart Stadium; Fort Lauderdale, FL		L 17–21	15,143	
October 2	7:00 p.m.	at South Florida*	Raymond James Stadium; Tampa, FL (rivalry)	BHSN	L 3–31	38,434	
October 9	7:00 p.m.	at Louisiana–Monroe	Malone Stadium; Monroe, LA		L 17–20	16,513	
October 23	1:00 p.m.	at Arkansas State	ASU Stadium; Jonesboro, AR	CST, CSS	L 16–37	13,159	
October 30	4:00 p.m.	FIU^{†}	Lockhart Stadium; Fort Lauderdale, FL (Shula Bowl)		W 21–9	17,543	
November 6	4:30 p.m.	at Western Kentucky	Houchens Industries–L. T. Smith Stadium; Bowling Green, KY		W 17–16	10,275	
November 13	7:00 p.m.	Louisiana–Lafayette	Lockhart Stadium; Fort Lauderdale, FL		W 24–23	12,044	
November 20	2:30 p.m.	at Texas*	Darrell K Royal–Texas Memorial Stadium; Austin, TX	FSN Florida	L 17–51	99,799	
November 27	3:30 p.m.	at Middle Tennessee	Johnny "Red" Floyd Stadium; Murfreesboro, TN		L 14–38	10,140	
December 4	1:00 p.m.	Troy	Lockhart Stadium; Fort Lauderdale, FL	ESPNU	L 7–44	11,368	
*Non-conference game; ^{†}Homecoming; All times are in Eastern time

== NFL draft ==
Tight end Rob Housler was selected in the third round with the 69th overall pick of the 2011 NFL draft by the Arizona Cardinals.
