= D'Joun Smith =

American football player (born 1992)

No. 20, 30
- Position: Cornerback

Personal information
- Born: September 23, 1992 (age 34); Miami, Florida, U.S.
- Listed height: 5 ft 10 in (1.78 m)
- Listed weight: 187 lb (85 kg)

Career information
- High school: American (Hialeah, Florida)
- College: Florida Atlantic
- NFL draft: 2015: 3rd round, 65th overall pick

Career history
- Indianapolis Colts (2015–2016); Detroit Lions (2016)*; Tennessee Titans (2016); Orlando Apollos (2019); Baltimore Brigade (2019)
- * Offseason or practice squad member only

Awards and highlights
- First-team All-C-USA (2013)

Career NFL statistics
- Total tackles: 1
- Fumble recoveries: 1
- Stats at Pro Football Reference

D'Joun Smith (born September 23, 1992) is an American former professional football player who was a cornerback in the National Football League (NFL). He played college football for the Florida Atlantic Owls and was selected in the third round of the 2015 NFL draft by the Indianapolis Colts. He also spent a season with the Tennessee Titans and Orlando Apollos.

== Early life ==
Smith attended American High School in Miami, Florida. As a senior, he had 75 tackles, seven interceptions, two touchdowns and 613 all-purpose yards.

== College career ==
Smith played at Florida Atlantic University from 2011 to 2014. He played in every game as a true freshman and became a starter his sophomore year in 2012. In his three years as a starter, Smith had nine interceptions.

== Professional career ==
Pre-draft measurables
Height	Weight	Arm length	Hand span	40-yard dash	20-yard shuttle	Three-cone drill	Vertical jump	Broad jump	Bench press
5 ft 10 in (1.78 m)	187 lb (85 kg)	30 3/8	8 1/8	4.45 s	4.26 s	6.96 s	36.0 in (0.91 m)	10 ft 4 in (3.15 m)	18 reps
All values from NFL Combine

=== Indianapolis Colts ===
Smith was selected in the third round (65th overall) of the 2015 NFL draft by the Indianapolis Colts. Before the start of the 2015 season, he was placed on injured reserve, with a designation to return. On November 16, Smith was activated from injured reserve. Smith was placed on season-ending injured reserve on December 24. He appeared in 4 games in 2015, recording 1 tackle.

On September 2, 2016, Smith was waived/injured by the Colts and placed on injured reserve. On September 12, he reached an injury settlement with the Colts, and was released.

=== Detroit Lions ===
On September 30, 2016, Smith was signed to the practice squad of the Detroit Lions. He was released by the Lions on November 10, 2016.

=== Tennessee Titans ===
On November 29, 2016, Smith was signed to the Tennessee Titans' practice squad. On December 21, 2016, he was promoted to the active roster.

On September 2, 2017, Smith was waived by the Titans.

=== Orlando Apollos ===
On September 14, 2018, Smith signed with Orlando Apollos of the Alliance of American Football (AAF), eventually making the final roster for the 2019 AAF season. He was waived on February 19, 2019.

=== Baltimore Brigade ===
On April 3, 2019, Smith was assigned to the Baltimore Brigade of the Arena Football League. He was reassigned on April 14, 2019.
