= Rusty Smith (American football) =

American football player and coach (born 1987)

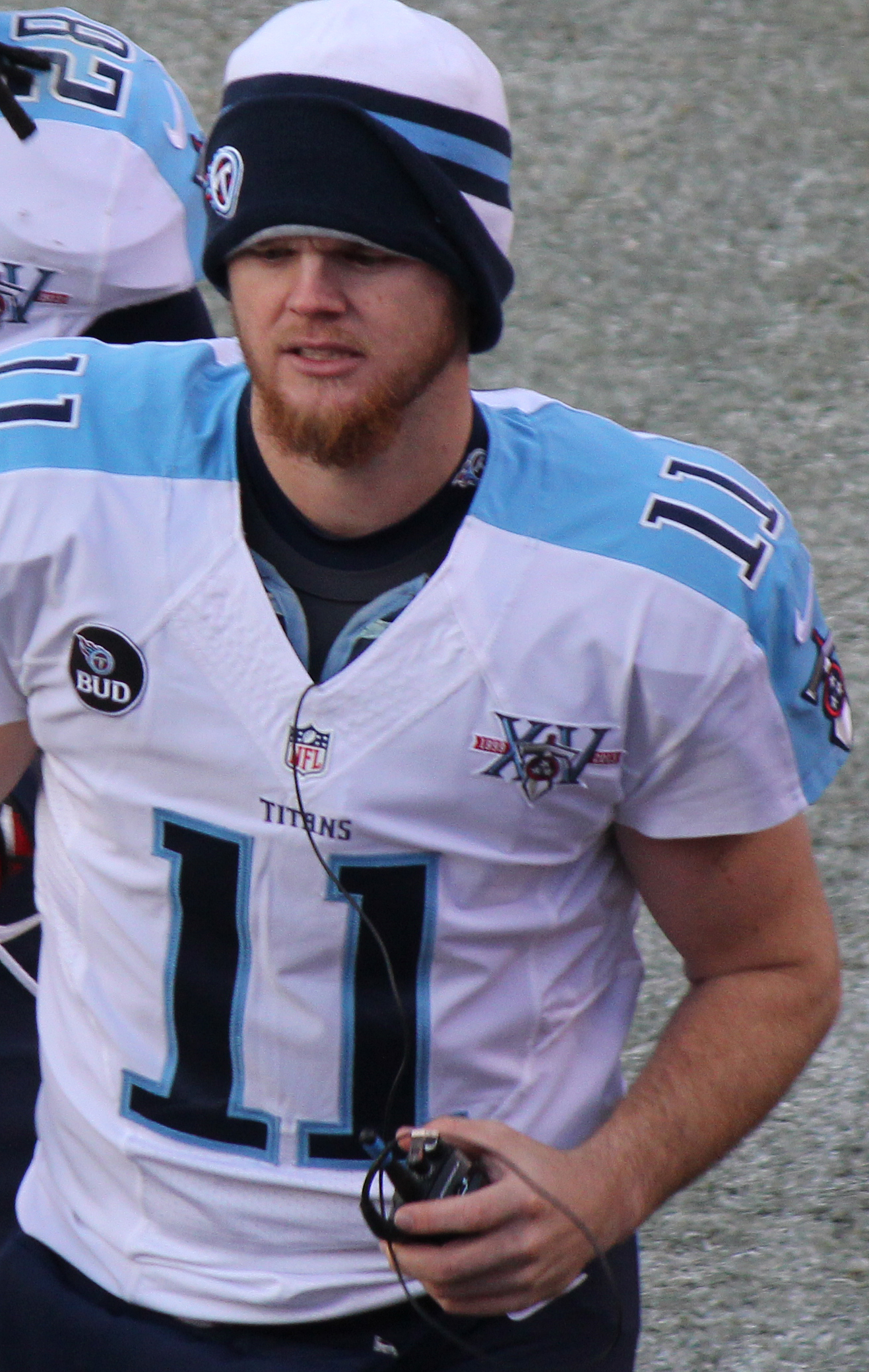
- Smith with the Tennessee Titans in 2013

No. 11
- Position: Quarterback

Personal information
- Born: January 28, 1987 (age 39); Jacksonville, Florida, U.S.
- Listed height: 6 ft 5 in (1.96 m)
- Listed weight: 226 lb (103 kg)

Career information
- High school: Sandalwood (Jacksonville)
- College: Florida Atlantic (2005–2009)
- NFL draft: 2010: 6th round, 176th overall pick

Career history

Playing
- Tennessee Titans (2010–2013); New York Giants (2014)*; Calgary Stampeders (2014)*
- * Offseason or practice squad member only

Coaching
- Grace Christian (2013–2014) Offensive coordinator & quarterbacks coach; Grace Christian (2015–2021) Head coach

Awards and highlights
- Sun Belt Player of the Year (2007); First-team All-Sun Belt (2007)

Career NFL statistics
- Passing attempts: 45
- Passing completions: 23
- Completion percentage: 51.1%
- TD–INT: 0–4
- Passing yards: 234
- Passer rating: 29.3
- Stats at Pro Football Reference

Russell Edgar Smith (born January 28, 1987) is an American former professional football player who was a quarterback in the National Football League (NFL). He played college football for the Florida Atlantic Owls and was selected by the Tennessee Titans in the sixth round of the 2010 NFL draft.

Smith was with the Titans for four years as a backup, playing in three regular season games with one start. In 2014, he had offseason stints with the New York Giants and later the Calgary Stampeders of the Canadian Football League (CFL). After his playing career ended, he began a career as a high school football coach.

== Early life ==
Russell Edgar Smith was born on January 28, 1987, in Jacksonville, Florida. He attended Sandalwood High School in Jacksonville.

== College career ==
As a sophomore for the Owls at Florida Atlantic University, Smith passed for 32 touchdowns and nine interceptions. In his four-year career, he started in 45 games for the Owls. He graduated with a Bachelor of Science in Management of Information Systems.

== Professional career ==
Pre-draft measurables
| Height | Weight | 40-yard dash | 10-yard split | 20-yard split | 20-yard shuttle | Three-cone drill | Vertical jump | Broad jump |
|---|---|---|---|---|---|---|---|---|
| 6 ft 5 in (1.96 m) | 224 lb (102 kg) | 4.83 s | 1.71 s | 2.90 s | 4.61 s | 7.04 s | 23 in (0.58 m) | 8 ft 4 in (2.54 m) |
All values from Florida Atlantic's Pro Day workout on March 4, 2010

=== Tennessee Titans ===
Smith was selected by the Tennessee Titans in the sixth round (176th overall) of the 2010 NFL draft. He was the first ever player from FAU to be drafted. He was signed to a four-year contract on June 17, 2010.

Smith made his NFL debut on November 21, 2010 against the Washington Redskins after starter Vince Young left the game with an injured throwing hand, completing 3-of-9 passes for 62 yards and one interception. Titans head coach Jeff Fisher later declared that Smith would become the team's starting quarterback due to Young's season-ending thumb surgery and Kerry Collins' calf injury. His first start was in a 20–0 shutout loss to the Houston Texans. Smith had 17 completions in 31 passes for 138 yards and was intercepted three times, all by CB Glover Quin.

Smith did not play in any games during the 2011 regular season.

In 2012, he stepped in for Matt Hasselbeck and went 3-of-5 for 34 yards. He was waived/injured by the Titans on August 31, 2013. He was re-signed the next day, and put on the team's practice squad.

=== New York Giants ===
On April 28, 2014, the New York Giants signed Smith. He was released on May 12, 2014.

=== Calgary Stampeders ===
Smith signed with the Calgary Stampeders of the Canadian Football League (CFL) on June 4, 2014. He was released on June 21, 2014.

== Career statistics ==
=== NFL ===
| Year | Team | Games | | | Passing | | | | | | | | Rushing | | | | Sacks | | Fumbles (Note: Fumbles lost data taken from Pro Football Reference career game log) | |
| Year | Team | GP | GS | Record | Cmp | Att | Pct | Yds | Y/A | TD | Int | Rtg | Att | Yds | Avg | TD | Sck | SckY | Fum | Lost |
|---|---|---|---|---|---|---|---|---|---|---|---|---|---|---|---|---|---|---|---|---|
| 2010 | TEN | 2 | 1 | 0–1 | 20 | 40 | 50.0 | 200 | 5.0 | 0 | 4 | 25.0 | 0 | 0 | 0.0 | 0 | 1 | 0 | 0 | 0 |
| 2011 | TEN | 0 | 0 | DNP | | | | | | | | | | | | | | | | |
| 2012 | TEN | 1 | 0 | – | 3 | 5 | 60.0 | 34 | 6.8 | 0 | 0 | 80.4 | 0 | 0 | 0.0 | 0 | 0 | 0 | 0 | 0 |
| Career | | 3 | 1 | 0–1 | 23 | 45 | 51.1 | 234 | 5.2 | 0 | 4 | 29.3 | 0 | 0 | 0.0 | 0 | 1 | 0 | 0 | 0 |

=== College ===
| | | Passing | | | | | | | | Rushing | | |
| Season | Team | GP | Cmp | Att | Pct | Yds | TD | Int | Rtg | Att | Yds | TD |
|---|---|---|---|---|---|---|---|---|---|---|---|---|
| 2006 | Florida Atlantic | 12 | 108 | 194 | 55.7 | 1,285 | 6 | 8 | 107.1 | 25 | −110 | 0 |
| 2007 | Florida Atlantic | 13 | 281 | 479 | 58.7 | 3,688 | 32 | 9 | 141.6 | 39 | −116 | 2 |
| 2008 | Florida Atlantic | 13 | 234 | 435 | 53.8 | 3,224 | 24 | 14 | 127.8 | 37 | −82 | 2 |
| 2009 | Florida Atlantic | 7 | 145 | 253 | 57.3 | 1,915 | 14 | 5 | 135.2 | 14 | −27 | 1 |
| Career | | 45 | 768 | 1,361 | 56.0 | 10,112 | 76 | 36 | 127.9 | 115 | −335 | 5 |

== Coaching career ==
In March 2015, Smith was announced as the new head football coach at the Grace Christian Academy in Franklin, Tennessee, having previously worked two years as the program's quarterbacks coach and offensive coordinator. He parted ways with GCA in February 2022 after eight seasons, having compiled a 21–49 record over seven seasons as head coach and leading the GCA Lions to all three of the team's playoff appearances in 2017 (1A), 2020 and 2021 (both DII-A).

== Missionary career ==
After parting ways with GCA, Smith and his family began a two year commitment in Kijabe, Kenya as part of Africa Inland Mission in 2023. He is a teacher at Rift Valley Academy, a Christian boarding school operated by AIM.

== Personal life ==
Smith's wife, Nicole, is the former head volleyball coach and strength and conditioning coach at Grace Christian Academy. They have four sons, Rustyn, Camdyn, Koltyn and Eastyn.
