= 2004 Portland State Vikings football team =

American college football season

2004 Portland State Vikings football
- Conference: Big Sky Conference
- Record: 7–4 (4–3 Big Sky)
- Head coach: Tim Walsh (12th season)
- Home stadium: PGE Park

2004 Big Sky Conference football standings
	Conf.			Overall
Team	W		L	W		L
No. 2 Montana $^	6	–	1	12	–	3
No. 8 Eastern Washington ^	6	–	1	9	–	4
Montana State	4	–	3	6	–	5
Portland State	4	–	3	7	–	4
Northern Arizona	3	–	4	4	–	7
Idaho State	2	–	5	3	–	8
Sacramento State	2	–	5	3	–	8
Weber State	1	–	6	1	–	10
$ – Conference champion; ^ – NCAA Division I-AA playoff participant; Rankings from The Sports Network poll

The 2004 Portland State Vikings football team was an American football team that represented Portland State University during the 2004 NCAA Division I-AA football season as a member of the Big Sky Conference. In their 12th year under head coach Tim Walsh, the team compiled an 7–4 record, with a mark of 4–3 in conference play, and finished tied for third in the Big Sky. The Vikings played their home games at PGE Park in Portland, Oregon.

== Schedule ==
Date	Opponent	Site	Result	Attendance	Source
September 2	Western State (CO)*	PGE Park; Portland, OR	W 38–0		
September 18	at No. 19 (I-A) Fresno State*	Bulldog Stadium; Fresno, CA	L 17–27	42,662	
September 25	No. 12 McNeese State*	PGE Park; Portland, OR	W 35–14	6,802	
October 2	Eastern Washington	PGE Park; Portland, OR (rivalry)	L 21–41		
October 9	at Sacramento State	Hornet Stadium; Sacramento, CA	W 31–0	6,763	
October 16	at Montana State	Bobcat Stadium; Bozeman, MT	L 24–31	10,754	
October 23	at Northern Arizona	Walkup Skydome; Flagstaff, AZ	L 20–21	9,020	
October 30	No. 4 Montana	PGE Park; Portland, OR	W 35–32	8,413	
November 6	Idaho State	PGE Park; Portland, OR	W 42–21	4,129	
November 13	at Weber State	Stewart Stadium; Ogden, UT	W 34–15		
November 20	UC Davis*	PGE Park; Portland, OR	W 38–21		
*Non-conference game; Rankings from The Sports Network Poll released prior to the game
