= 2004 Weber State Wildcats football team =

American college football season

2004 Weber State Wildcats football
- Conference: Big Sky Conference
- Record: 1–10 (1–6 Big Sky)
- Head coach: Jerry Graybeal (7th season)
- Home stadium: Stewart Stadium

2004 Big Sky Conference football standings
	Conf.			Overall
Team	W		L	W		L
No. 2 Montana $^	6	–	1	12	–	3
No. 8 Eastern Washington ^	6	–	1	9	–	4
Montana State	4	–	3	6	–	5
Portland State	4	–	3	7	–	4
Northern Arizona	3	–	4	4	–	7
Idaho State	2	–	5	3	–	8
Sacramento State	2	–	5	3	–	8
Weber State	1	–	6	1	–	10
$ – Conference champion; ^ – NCAA Division I-AA playoff participant; Rankings from The Sports Network poll

The 2004 Weber State Wildcats football team represented Weber State University as a member of the Big Sky Conference during the 2004 NCAA Division I-AA football season. Led by seventh-year head coach Jerry Graybeal, the Wildcats compiled an overall record of 1–10, with a mark of 1–6 in conference play, and finished eighth in the Big Sky. The team played home games at Stewart Stadium in Ogden, Utah.

== Schedule ==
Date	Opponent	Site	Result	Attendance	Source
September 4	Southern Utah*	Stewart Stadium; Ogden, UT (Beehive Bowl)	L 31–34	9,244	
September 11	at UTEP*	Sun Bowl; El Paso, TX	L 0–32	34,229	
September 18	UC Davis*	Stewart Stadium; Ogden, UT	L 29–31	8,301	
September 25	at No. 23 Northern Arizona	Walkup Skydome; Flagstaff, AZ	L 27–55	9,836	
October 2	No. 7 Montana	Stewart Stadium; Ogden, UT	L 21–42	5,139	
October 9	at Montana State	Bobcat Stadium; Bozeman, MT	L 17–20	13,327	
October 16	at Sacramento State	Hornet Stadium; Sacramento, CA	L 12–31	3,865	
October 23	Eastern Washington	Stewart Stadium; Ogden, UT	L 7–51	4,623	
October 30	at Idaho State	Holt Arena; Pocatello, ID	W 26–14	6,145	
November 6	North Dakota State*	Stewart Stadium; Ogden, UT	L 17–31	4,112	
November 13	Portland State	Stewart Stadium; Ogden, UT	L 15–34		
*Non-conference game; Rankings from The Sports Network Poll released prior to the game
