= 2004 Nicholls State Colonels football team =

American college football season

2004 Nicholls State Colonels football
- Conference: Southland Conference
- Record: 5–5 (2–3 Southland)
- Head coach: Jay Thomas (1st season)
- Offensive coordinator: H. T. Kinney (1st season)
- Offensive scheme: Spread option
- Base defense: Multiple 4–3
- Home stadium: John L. Guidry Stadium

2004 Southland Conference football standings
	Conf.			Overall
Team	W		L	W		L
No. 4 Sam Houston State +^	4	–	1	11	–	3
No. 17 Northwestern State +^	4	–	1	8	–	4
Texas State	3	–	2	5	–	6
Nicholls State	2	–	3	5	–	5
Stephen F. Austin	1	–	4	6	–	4
McNeese State	1	–	4	4	–	7
+ – Conference co-champions; ^ – NCAA Division I-AA playoff participant; Rankings from The Sports Network poll

The 2004 Nicholls State Colonels football team represented Nicholls State University as a member of the Southland Conference during the 2004 NCAA Division I-AA football season. Led by first-year head Jay Thomas, the Colonels compiled an overall record of 5–5 with a mark of 2–3 in conference play, placing fourth in the Southland. Nicholls State played home games at John L. Guidry Stadium in Thibodaux, Louisiana.

== Schedule ==
Date	Time	Opponent	Site	Result	Attendance	Source
September 2	6:30 p.m.	Eastern Washington*	John L. Guidry Stadium; Thibodaux, LA	W 37–14	4,731	
September 11	3:00 p.m.	at Western Carolina*	E. J. Whitmire Stadium; Cullowhee, NC	L 7–28	6,972	
September 25	7:00 p.m.	at Texas Southern*	Robertson Stadium; Houston, TX	W 21–6	5,432	
October 2	4:00 p.m.	North Dakota State*	John L. Guidry Stadium; Thibodaux, LA	L 14–24	5,421	
October 9	6:00 p.m.	at Florida A&M*	Bragg Memorial Stadium; Tallahassee, FL	W 42–25	8,196	
October 16	2:00 p.m.	at No. 13 Sam Houston State	Bowers Stadium; Huntsville, TX	L 10–38	10,038	
October 21	7:00 p.m.	No. 9 Northwestern State	John L. Guidry Stadium; Thibodaux, LA (NSU Challenge)	W 40–14	5,414	
November 6	6:30 p.m.	No. 18 Stephen F. Austin	John L. Guidry Stadium; Thibodaux, LA	W 41–23	7,637	
November 13	2:00 p.m.	Texas State	John L. Guidry Stadium; Thibodaux, LA (Battle for the Paddle)	L 12–35	8,136	
November 20	7:00 p.m.	at McNeese State	Cowboy Stadium; Lake Charles, LA	L 9–30	7,400	
*Non-conference game; Rankings from The Sports Network Poll released prior to the game; All times are in Central time
