= 2004 FIU Golden Panthers football team =

American college football season

2004 FIU Golden Panthers football
- Conference: Independent
- Record: 0–7, 3 wins vacated
- Head coach: Don Strock (3rd season)
- Offensive coordinator: Greg Briner (3rd season)
- Offensive scheme: Pro-style
- Defensive coordinator: Bernard Clark (1st season)
- Base defense: 4–3
- Home stadium: FIU Stadium

2004 NCAA Division I-AA independents football standings
	Conf.			Overall
Team	W		L	W		L
Florida Atlantic		–		9	–	3
Southeastern Louisiana		–		7	–	4
FIU		–		3	–	7
Savannah State		–		2	–	8

The 2004 FIU Golden Panthers football team represented Florida International University (FIU) as an independent during the 2004 NCAA Division I-AA football season. Led by third-year head coach Don Strock, the Panthers compiled a record of 3–7. The team played home game at FIU Stadium in Miami.

In 2008, the NCAA Division I Committee on Infractions found major violations within the FIU football program, and vacated the Panthers' three wins from the 2004 season.

== Schedule ==
Date	Time	Opponent	Site	Result	Attendance	Source
September 11	5:05 p.m.	at Youngstown State	Stambaugh Stadium; Youngstown, OH	W 22–16 ^{OT} (vacated)	14,071	
October 2	6:05 p.m.	Louisiana–Lafayette	FIU Stadium; Miami, FL	L 34–43	10,022	
October 9	8:00 p.m.	at No. 5 Stephen F. Austin	Homer Bryce Stadium; Nacogdoches, TX	W 31–24 (vacated)	4,131	
October 16	3:30 p.m.	at Louisiana–Monroe	Malone Stadium; Monroe, LA	L 20–28	14,496	
October 23	6:00 p.m.	McNeese State	FIU Stadium; Miami, FL	L 27–30	8,457	
October 30	8:05 p.m.	at New Mexico State	Aggie Memorial Stadium; Las Cruces, NM	L 31–56	14,472	
November 13	11:00 a.m.	No. 6 Georgia Southern^{†}	FIU Stadium; Miami, FL	L 32–53	7,876	
November 20	4:00 p.m.	No. 3 Western Kentucky	FIU Stadium; Miami, FL	L 14–35	3,108	
November 27	1:00 p.m.	Florida A&M	Miami Orange Bowl; Miami, FL	W 40–23 (vacated)	21,010	
December 4	4:00 p.m.	at Florida Atlantic	Pro Player Stadium; Miami Gardens, FL (Shula Bowl)	L 10–17	16,262	
^{†}Homecoming; Rankings from The Sports Network Poll released prior to the game; All times are in Eastern time
