= 2004 Texas State Bobcats football team =

American college football season

2004 Texas State Bobcats football
- Conference: Southland Conference
- Record: 5–6 (3–2 SLC)
- Head coach: David Bailiff (1st season)
- Co-offensive coordinators: Blake Miller (3rd season); Frank Hernandez (1st season)
- Offensive scheme: Pro-style
- Defensive coordinator: Craig Naivar (1st season)
- Base defense: 3–4
- Home stadium: Bobcat Stadium

2004 Southland Conference football standings
	Conf.			Overall
Team	W		L	W		L
No. 4 Sam Houston State +^	4	–	1	11	–	3
No. 17 Northwestern State +^	4	–	1	8	–	4
Texas State	3	–	2	5	–	6
Nicholls State	2	–	3	5	–	5
Stephen F. Austin	1	–	4	6	–	4
McNeese State	1	–	4	4	–	7
+ – Conference co-champions; ^ – NCAA Division I-AA playoff participant; Rankings from The Sports Network poll

The 2004 Texas State Bobcats football team was an American football team that represented Texas State University–San Marcos (now known as Texas State University) during the 2004 NCAA Division I-AA football season as a member of the Southland Conference (SLC). In their first year under head coach David Bailiff, the team compiled an overall record of 5–6 with a mark of 3–2 in conference play.

== Schedule ==
Date	Opponent	Site	Result	Attendance	Source
September 4	Angelo State*	Bobcat Stadium; San Marcos, TX	W 45–10		
September 10	at Baylor*	Floyd Casey Stadium; Waco, TX	L 17–24	28,533	
September 18	Southeastern Louisiana*	Bobcat Stadium; San Marcos, TX	W 31–28 ^{2OT}	13,114	
October 2	at No. 24 Appalachian State*	Kidd Brewer Stadium; Boone, NC	L 34–41	13,619	
October 9	Florida Atlantic*	Bobcat Stadium; San Marcos, TX	L 13–20	8,314	
October 16	at No. 9 Cal Poly*	Mustang Stadium; San Luis Obispo, CA	L 21–38	9,352	
October 23	Stephen F. Austin	Bobcat Stadium; San Marcos, TX	W 17–14	13,323	
October 30	at McNeese State	Cowboy Stadium; Lake Charles, LA	W 54–27	11,625	
November 6	at No. 22 Northwestern State	Harry Turpin Stadium; Natchitoches, LA	L 7–44	5,720	
November 13	Nicholls State	Bobcat Stadium; San Marcos, TX (rivalry)	W 35–12	8,136	
November 20	at No. 10 Sam Houston State	Bowers Stadium; Huntsville, TX (rivalry)	L 9–27		
*Non-conference game; Rankings from The Sports Network Poll released prior to the game
