= 2004 Idaho State Bengals football team =

American college football season

2004 Idaho State Bengals football
- Conference: Big Sky Conference
- Record: 3–8 (2–5 Big Sky)
- Head coach: Larry Lewis (6th season)
- Offensive coordinator: Bruce Barnum (4th season)
- Offensive scheme: Pro spread
- Defensive coordinator: James Ward (5th season)
- Base defense: 4–3
- Home stadium: Holt Arena

2004 Big Sky Conference football standings
	Conf.			Overall
Team	W		L	W		L
No. 2 Montana $^	6	–	1	12	–	3
No. 8 Eastern Washington ^	6	–	1	9	–	4
Montana State	4	–	3	6	–	5
Portland State	4	–	3	7	–	4
Northern Arizona	3	–	4	4	–	7
Idaho State	2	–	5	3	–	8
Sacramento State	2	–	5	3	–	8
Weber State	1	–	6	1	–	10
$ – Conference champion; ^ – NCAA Division I-AA playoff participant; Rankings from The Sports Network poll

The 2004 Idaho State Bengals football team represented Idaho State University as a member of the Big Sky Conference during the 2004 NCAA Division I-AA football season. Led by sixth-year head coach Larry Lewis, the Bengals compiled an overall record of 3–8, with a mark of 2–5 in conference play, and finished tied for sixth in the Big Sky. The team played home games at Holt Arena in Pocatello, Idaho.

== Schedule ==
Date	Opponent	Site	Result	Attendance	Source
September 4	at San Diego State*	Qualcomm Stadium; San Diego, CA	L 21–38	57,216	
September 11	Cal Poly*	Holt Arena; Pocatello, ID	L 20–35		
September 18	at Northern Colorado*	Nottingham Field; Greeley, CO	W 49–42 ^{2OT}		
September 25	at Eastern Washington	Woodward Field; Cheney, WA	L 22–47	5,581	
October 2	Montana State	Holt Arena; Pocatello, ID	L 13–17	7,028	
October 9	at No. 7 Montana	Washington–Grizzly Stadium; Missoula, MT	L 22–24	23,582	
October 23	Sacramento State	Holt Arena; Pocatello, ID	W 29–24	7,435	
October 30	Weber State	Holt Arena; Pocatello, ID	L 14–26	6,145	
November 6	at Portland State	PGE Park; Portland, OR	L 21–42	4,129	
November 13	Northern Arizona	Holt Arena; Pocatello, ID	W 24–17	5,658	
November 20	at Southern Utah*	Eccles Coliseum; Cedar City, UT	L 31–45	3,581	
*Non-conference game; Rankings from The Sports Network Poll released prior to the game
