= 2004 Sacramento State Hornets football team =

American college football season

2004 Sacramento State Hornets football
- Conference: Big Sky Conference
- Record: 3–8 (2–5 Big Sky)
- Head coach: Steve Mooshagian (2nd season)
- Defensive coordinator: Tim Skipper (1st season)
- Home stadium: Hornet Stadium

2004 Big Sky Conference football standings
	Conf.			Overall
Team	W		L	W		L
No. 2 Montana $^	6	–	1	12	–	3
No. 8 Eastern Washington ^	6	–	1	9	–	4
Montana State	4	–	3	6	–	5
Portland State	4	–	3	7	–	4
Northern Arizona	3	–	4	4	–	7
Idaho State	2	–	5	3	–	8
Sacramento State	2	–	5	3	–	8
Weber State	1	–	6	1	–	10
$ – Conference champion; ^ – NCAA Division I-AA playoff participant; Rankings from The Sports Network poll

The 2004 Sacramento State Hornets football team represented California State University, Sacramento as a member of the Big Sky Conference during the 2004 NCAA Division I-AA football season. Led by second-year head coach Steve Mooshagian, Sacramento State compiled an overall record of 3–8 with a mark of 2–5 in conference play, tying for sixth place in the Big Sky. The team was outscored by its opponents 415 to 190 for the season. The Hornets played home games at Hornet Stadium in Sacramento, California.

== Schedule ==
Date	Time	Opponent	Site	Result	Attendance	Source
September 11	1:00 p.m.	at Nevada*	Mackay Stadium; Reno, NV	L 7–59	16,611	
September 18	7:00 p.m.	Southern Utah*	Hornet Stadium; Sacramento, CA	W 23–17	4,509	
September 25	3:30 p.m.	at UC Davis*	Toomey Field; Davis, CA (Causeway Classic)	L 23–58	8,720	
October 2	2:30 p.m.	at No. 20 Northern Arizona	Walkup Skydome; Flagstaff, AZ	L 0–26	10,983	
October 9	6:00 p.m.	Portland State	Hornet Stadium; Sacramento, CA	L 0–31	6,763	
October 16	7:00 p.m.	Weber State	Hornet Stadium; Sacramento, CA	W 31–12	3,865	
October 23	3:00 p.m.	at Idaho State	Holt Arena; Pocatello, ID	L 24–29	7,435	
October 30	2:00 p.m.	at No. 25 Eastern Washington	Woodward Field; Cheney, WA	L 10–45	5,305	
November 6	4:00 p.m.	No. 17 Montana State	Hornet Stadium; Sacramento, CA	W 38–28	4,838	
November 13	11:00 a.m.	at No. 9 Montana	Washington–Grizzly Stadium; Missoula, MT	L 21–52	21,097	
November 20	4:00 p.m.	No. 18 Cal Poly*	Hornet Stadium; Sacramento, CA	L 13–58	4,895	
*Non-conference game; Rankings from The Sports Network Poll released prior to the game; All times are in Pacific time

== Team players in the NFL ==
No Sacramento State players were selected in the 2005 NFL draft.

The following finished their college career in 2004, were not drafted, but played in the NFL.

Player	Position	First NFL team
Otis Amey	Wide receiver	2005 San Francisco 49ers
