= 2004 Illinois State Redbirds football team =

American college football season

2004 Illinois State Redbirds football
- Conference: Gateway Football Conference
- Record: 4–7 (2–5 Gateway)
- Head coach: Denver Johnson (5th season)
- Offensive coordinator: Justin Fuente (1st season)
- MVPs: Boomer Grigsby; Brian Thompson
- Captains: Josh Chrestman; Boomer Grigsby; Mike Larson; Jeremy Melville; Antwan Oliver
- Home stadium: Hancock Stadium

2004 Gateway Football Conference standings
	Conf.			Overall
Team	W		L	W		L
No. 9 Southern Illinois $^	7	–	0	10	–	2
No. 11 Western Kentucky ^	6	–	1	9	–	3
No. 25 Northern Iowa	5	–	2	7	–	4
Southwest Missouri State	3	–	4	6	–	5
Western Illinois	2	–	5	4	–	7
Illinois State	2	–	5	4	–	7
Youngstown State	2	–	5	4	–	7
Indiana State	1	–	6	4	–	7
$ – Conference champion; ^ – NCAA Division I-AA playoff participant; Rankings from The Sports Network poll

The 2004 Illinois State Redbirds football team represented Illinois State University as a member of the Gateway Football Conference during the 2004 NCAA Division I-AA football season. Led by fifth-year head coach Denver Johnson, the Redbirds compiled an overall record of 4–7 with a mark of 2–5 in conference play, placing in a three-way tie for fifth in the Gateway. Illinois State played home games at Hancock Stadium in Normal, Illinois.

== Schedule ==
Date	Opponent	Site	Result	Attendance	Source
September 2	Saint Xavier*	Hancock Stadium; Normal, IL	W 44–14	7,573	
September 11	at No. 22 (I-A) Minnesota*	Hubert H. Humphrey Metrodome; Minneapolis, MN	L 21–37	34,006	
September 18	Eastern Illinois*	Hancock Stadium; Normal, IL (rivalry)	W 35–31	9,152	
October 2	at Indiana State	Memorial Stadium; Terre Haute, IN	L 38–41 ^{2OT}	2,825	
October 9	Southwest Missouri State	Hancock Stadium; Normal, IL	W 34–31	12,196	
October 16	at Western Illinois	Hanson Field; Macomb, IL	L 31–40	9,867	
October 23	Youngstown State^{†}	Hancock Stadium; Normal, IL	W 30–24	10,279	
October 30	at No. 7 Western Kentucky	L. T. Smith Stadium; Bowling Green, KY	L 21–24	7,126	
November 6	No. 1 Southern Illinois	Hancock Stadium; Normal, IL	L 14–41	8,019	
November 13	at Northern Iowa	UNI-Dome; Cedar Falls, IA	L 14–41	9,569	
November 20	at Florida Atlantic*	Lockhart Stadium; Fort Lauderdale, FL	L 0–28	8,296	
*Non-conference game; ^{†}Homecoming; Rankings from The Sports Network Poll released prior to the game
