= 2004 Southwest Missouri State Bears football team =

American college football season

2004 Southwest Missouri State Bears football
- Conference: Gateway Football Conference
- Record: 6–5 (3–4 GFC)
- Head coach: Randy Ball (6th season)
- Offensive coordinator: Dennis Darnell (1st season)
- Defensive coordinator: Deion Melvin (6th season)
- Captains: Travis Brown; Brad Durham; Torre Endsley; Steven Rush
- Home stadium: Plaster Sports Complex

2004 Gateway Football Conference standings
	Conf.			Overall
Team	W		L	W		L
No. 9 Southern Illinois $^	7	–	0	10	–	2
No. 11 Western Kentucky ^	6	–	1	9	–	3
No. 25 Northern Iowa	5	–	2	7	–	4
Southwest Missouri State	3	–	4	6	–	5
Western Illinois	2	–	5	4	–	7
Illinois State	2	–	5	4	–	7
Youngstown State	2	–	5	4	–	7
Indiana State	1	–	6	4	–	7
$ – Conference champion; ^ – NCAA Division I-AA playoff participant; Rankings from The Sports Network poll

The 2004 Southwest Missouri State Bears football team represented Southwest Missouri State University (now known as Missouri State University) as a member of the Gateway Football Conference (GFC) during the 2004 NCAA Division I-AA football season. Led by sixth-year head coach Randy Ball, the Bears compiled an overall record of 6–5, with a mark of 3–4 in conference play, and finished fourth in the GFC.

== Schedule ==
Date	Time	Opponent	Site	Result	Attendance	Source
September 2		Drake*	Plaster Sports Complex; Springfield, MO	W 31–26	10,304	
September 11		Sam Houston State*	Plaster Sports Complex; Springfield, MO	W 33–31	10,039	
September 18		Union (KY)*	Plaster Sports Complex; Springfield, MO	W 45–0	9,182	
September 25		at Tulsa*	Skelly Stadium; Tulsa, OK	L 7–49	17,980	
October 2		Western Illinois	Plaster Sports Complex; Springfield, MO	W 36–31	10,082	
October 9		at Illinois State	Hancock Stadium; Normal, IL	L 31–34	12,196	
October 16		at Indiana State	Memorial Stadium; Terre Haute, IN	W 31–28		
October 23		No. 1 Southern Illinois	Plaster Sports Complex; Springfield, MO	L 3–27	15,122	
October 30	4:05 p.m.	at Northern Iowa	UNI-Dome; Cedar Falls, IA	L 20–42	6,152	
November 6		No. 5 Western Kentucky	Plaster Sports Complex; Springfield, MO	L 24–28	8,942	
November 13		Youngstown State	Plaster Sports Complex; Springfield, MO	W 34–28		
*Non-conference game; Rankings from The Sports Network Poll released prior to the game; All times are in Central time
