= 2004 Southern Illinois Salukis football team =

American college football season

2004 Southern Illinois Salukis football

Gateway champion

NCAA Division I-AA First Round, L 31–35 vs. Eastern Washington
- Conference: Gateway Football Conference

Ranking
- Sports Network: No. 9
- Record: 10–2 (7–0 Gateway)
- Head coach: Jerry Kill (4th season)
- Offensive coordinator: Matt Limegrover (4th season)
- Defensive coordinator: Tracy Claeys (4th season)
- Home stadium: McAndrew Stadium

2004 Gateway Football Conference standings
	Conf.			Overall
Team	W		L	W		L
No. 9 Southern Illinois $^	7	–	0	10	–	2
No. 11 Western Kentucky ^	6	–	1	9	–	3
No. 25 Northern Iowa	5	–	2	7	–	4
Southwest Missouri State	3	–	4	6	–	5
Western Illinois	2	–	5	4	–	7
Illinois State	2	–	5	4	–	7
Youngstown State	2	–	5	4	–	7
Indiana State	1	–	6	4	–	7
$ – Conference champion; ^ – NCAA Division I-AA playoff participant; Rankings from The Sports Network poll

The 2004 Southern Illinois Salukis football team represented Southern Illinois University as a member of the Gateway Football Conference during the 2004 NCAA Division I-AA football season. They were led by fourth-year head coach Jerry Kill and played their home games at McAndrew Stadium in Carbondale, Illinois. The Salukis finished the season with a 10–2 record overall and a 7–0 record in conference play, making them conference champions. The team received an automatic bid to the Division I-AA playoffs, where they lost to Eastern Washington in the first round. Southern Illinois was ranked No. 9 in The Sports Network's postseason ranking of FCS teams.

Running back Brandon Jacobs, a transfer from Auburn, rushed for 992 yards and 19 touchdowns during the season. He was drafted by the New York Giants in the 2005 NFL draft.

== Schedule ==
Date	Opponent	Rank	Site	Result	Attendance	Source
September 2	Southeast Missouri State*	No. 2	McAndrew Stadium; Carbondale, IL	W 42–3	11,314	
September 11	at Northern Illinois*	No. 1	Huskie Stadium; DeKalb, IL	L 22–23	28,071	
September 18	William Penn*	No. 2	McAndrew Stadium; Carbondale, IL	W 59–9	9,435	
September 25	at Delaware State*	No. 1	Alumni Stadium; Dover, DE	W 49–0	1,734	
October 2	No. 15 Northern Iowa	No. 1	McAndrew Stadium; Carbondale, IL	W 40–36	12,326	
October 9	at Youngstown State	No. 1	Stambaugh Stadium; Youngstown, OH	W 37–2	16,837	
October 16	No. 4 Western Kentucky	No. 1	McAndrew Stadium; Carbondale, IL	W 38–10	10,143	
October 23	at Southwest Missouri State	No. 1	Plaster Sports Complex; Springfield, MO	W 27–3	15,122	
October 30	Western Illinois	No. 1	McAndrew Stadium; Carbondale, IL	W 66–13	10,045	
November 6	at Illinois State	No. 1	Hancock Stadium; Normal, IL	W 41–14	8,019	
November 13	Indiana State	No. 1	McAndrew Stadium; Carbondale, IL	W 59–10	7,423	
November 27	No. 14 Eastern Washington*	No. 1	McAndrew Stadium; Carbondale, IL (NCAA Division I-AA First Round)	L 31–35	7,304	
*Non-conference game; Rankings from The Sports Network Poll released prior to the game
