= 2004 Humboldt State Lumberjacks football team =

American college football season

2004 Humboldt State Lumberjacks football
- Conference: Great Northwest Athletic Conference
- Record: 5–5 (3–3 GNAC)
- Head coach: Doug Adkins (5th season)
- Home stadium: Redwood Bowl

2004 Great Northwest Athletic Conference football standings
	Conf.			Overall
Team	W		L	W		L
Central Washington $	5	–	1	7	–	4
Western Washington	3	–	3	6	–	4
Humboldt State	3	–	3	5	–	5
Western Oregon	1	–	5	1	–	9
$ – Conference champion

The 2004 Humboldt State Lumberjacks football team represented Humboldt State University—now known as California State Polytechnic University, Humboldt—as a member of the Great Northwest Athletic Conference (GNAC) during the 2004 NCAA Division II football season. Led fifth-year head coach Doug Adkins, the Lumberjacks compiled an overall record of 5–5 with a mark of 3–3 in conference play, tying for second place in the GNAC. The team was outscored its by opponents 253 to 221 for the season. Humboldt State played home games at the Redwood Bowl in Arcata, California.

This season marked a change in scheduling for the GNAC. Each member team played it conference foes twice during the season (home and away) instead of just once. That format continued through the 2013 season.

== Schedule ==
Date	Opponent	Site	Result
August 28	Menlo*	Redwood Bowl; Arcata, CA	W 42–14
September 4	at Cal Poly*	Mustang Stadium; San Luis Obispo, CA	L 7–42
September 11	Southern Oregon*	Redwood Bowl; Arcata, CA	W 32–0
September 18	at Azusa Pacific*	Cougar Athletic Stadium; Azusa, CA	L 10–17
September 25	Western Oregon	Redwood Bowl; Arcata, CA	W 34–7
October 2	at Central Washington	Tomlinson Stadium; Ellensburg, WA	L 0–45
October 16	at Western Washington	Civic Stadium; Bellingham, WA	W 34–27
October 23	Central Washington	Redwood Bowl; Arcata, CA	L 3–13
October 30	at Western Oregon	McArthur Field; Monmouth, OR	W 39–33
November 6	Western Washington	Redwood Bowl; Arcata, CA	L 20–55
*Non-conference game
