= 2004 Sam Houston State Bearkats football team =

American college football season

2004 Sam Houston State Bearkats football

Southland co-champion

NCAA Division I-AA Semifinal, L 13–34 at Montana
- Conference: Southland Conference

Ranking
- Sports Network: No. 4
- Record: 11–3 (4–1 Southland)
- Head coach: Ron Randleman (23rd season)
- Defensive coordinator: Mike Lucas (15th season)
- Home stadium: Bowers Stadium

2004 Southland Conference football standings
	Conf.			Overall
Team	W		L	W		L
No. 4 Sam Houston State +^	4	–	1	11	–	3
No. 17 Northwestern State +^	4	–	1	8	–	4
Texas State	3	–	2	5	–	6
Nicholls State	2	–	3	5	–	5
Stephen F. Austin	1	–	4	6	–	4
McNeese State	1	–	4	4	–	7
+ – Conference co-champions; ^ – NCAA Division I-AA playoff participant; Rankings from The Sports Network poll

The 2004 Sam Houston State Bearkats football team represented Sam Houston State University as a member of the Southland Conference during the 2004 NCAA Division I-AA football season. Led by 23rd-year head coach Ron Randleman, the Bearkats compiled an overall record of 11–3 with a mark of 4–1 in conference play, and finished as Southland co-champion with Northwestern State. Sam Houston State advanced to the Division I-AA playoffs and defeated Western Kentucky and Eastern Washington before losing to Montana in the semifinal.

== Schedule ==
Date	Opponent	Rank	Site	Result	Attendance	Source
September 4	Ouachita Baptist*		Bowers Stadium; Huntsville, TX	W 60–7		
September 11	at Southwest Missouri State*		Plaster Sports Complex; Springfield, MO	L 31–33	10,039	
September 18	No. 1 Montana*		Bowers Stadium; Huntsville, TX	W 41–29	12,941	
September 25	at Southeastern Louisiana*	No. 24	Strawberry Stadium; Hammond, LA	W 45–17	9,480	
October 7	Tarleton State*	No. 13	Bowers Stadium; Huntsville, TX	W 44–14	6,944	
October 16	Nicholls State	No. 13	Bowers Stadium; Huntsville, TX	W 38–10	10,038	
October 23	Northern Colorado*	No. 11	Bowers Stadium; Huntsville, TX	W 20–7		
October 30	at No. 13 Stephen F. Austin	No. 8	Homer Bryce Stadium; Nacogdoches, TX (Battle of the Piney Woods)	W 31–28	13,753	
November 6	McNeese State	No. 4	Bowers Stadium; Huntsville, TX	W 52–47	8,152	
November 13	at No. 19 Northwestern State	No. 3	Harry Turpin Stadium; Natchitoches, LA	L 27–45	7,320	
November 20	Texas State	No. 10	Bowers Stadium; Huntsville, TX (rivalry)	W 27–9		
November 27	No. 11 Western Kentucky*	No. 4	Bowers Stadium; Huntsville, TX (NCAA Division I-AA First Round)	W 54–24	9,554	
December 4	at No. 8 Eastern Washington*	No. 4	Woodward Field; Cheney, WA (NCAA Division I-AA Quarterfinal)	W 35–34	7,633	
December 11	at No. 2 Montana*	No. 4	Washington–Grizzly Stadium; Missoula, MT (NCAA Division I-AA Semifinal)	L 13–34	23,607	
*Non-conference game; Rankings from The Sports Network Poll released prior to the game
