= 2004 Northern Arizona Lumberjacks football team =

American college football season

2004 Northern Arizona Lumberjacks football
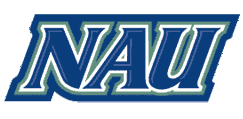
- Conference: Big Sky Conference
- Record: 4–7 (3–4 Big Sky)
- Head coach: Jerome Souers (7th season)
- Home stadium: Walkup Skydome

2004 Big Sky Conference football standings
	Conf.			Overall
Team	W		L	W		L
No. 2 Montana $^	6	–	1	12	–	3
No. 8 Eastern Washington ^	6	–	1	9	–	4
Montana State	4	–	3	6	–	5
Portland State	4	–	3	7	–	4
Northern Arizona	3	–	4	4	–	7
Idaho State	2	–	5	3	–	8
Sacramento State	2	–	5	3	–	8
Weber State	1	–	6	1	–	10
$ – Conference champion; ^ – NCAA Division I-AA playoff participant; Rankings from The Sports Network poll

The 2004 Northern Arizona Lumberjacks football team was an American football team that represented Northern Arizona University (NAU) as a member of the Big Sky Conference (Big Sky) during the 2004 NCAA Division I-AA football season. In their seventh year under head coach Jerome Souers, the Lumberjacks compiled a 4–7 record (3–4 against conference opponents), were outscored by a total of 314 to 244, and finished fifth out of eight teams in the Big Sky.

The team played its home games at the J. Lawrence Walkup Skydome, commonly known as the Walkup Skydome, in Flagstaff, Arizona.

== Schedule ==
Date	Time	Opponent	Rank	Site	Result	Attendance	Source
September 4		at Arizona*	No. 14	Arizona Stadium; Tucson, AZ	L 3–21	49,741	
September 11	6:00 p.m.	at Stephen F. Austin*	No. 13	Homer Bryce Stadium; Nacogdoches, TX	L 17–24 ^{OT}	8,307	
September 25		Weber State	No. 23	Walkup Skydome; Flagstaff, AZ	W 55–27	9,836	
October 2		Sacramento State^{†}	No. 20	Walkup Skydome; Flagstaff, AZ	W 26–0	10,983	
October 9		at Eastern Washington	No. 16	Woodward Field; Cheney, WA	L 14–45	5,171	
October 16		Western New Mexico*		Walkup Skydome; Flagstaff, AZ	W 34–14	7,090	
October 23		Portland State		Walkup Skydome; Flagstaff, AZ	W 21–20	9,020	
October 30		Montana State		Walkup Skydome; Flagstaff, AZ	L 14–60	6,495	
November 6		at No. 10 Montana		Washington–Grizzly Stadium; Missoula, MT	L 22–34	22,274	
November 13		at Idaho State		Holt Arena; Pocatello, ID	L 17–24	5,658	
November 20	6:05 p.m.	Northern Iowa*		UNI-Dome; Cedar Falls, IA	L 21–45		
*Non-conference game; ^{†}Homecoming; Rankings from The Sports Network Poll released prior to the game; All times are in Mountain time
