= 2004 UC Davis Aggies football team =

American college football season

2004 UC Davis Aggies football
- Conference: Great West Conference
- Record: 6–4 (3–2 GWC)
- Head coach: Bob Biggs (12th season)
- Offensive coordinator: Mike Moroski (12th season)
- Home stadium: Toomey Field

2004 Great West Conference football standings
	Conf.			Overall
Team	W		L	W		L
No. 16 Cal Poly $	4	–	1	9	–	2
UC Davis	3	–	2	6	–	4
No. 23 North Dakota State	2	–	3	8	–	3
South Dakota State	2	–	3	6	–	5
Southern Utah	2	–	3	6	–	5
Northern Colorado	2	–	3	2	–	9
$ – Conference champion; Rankings from The Sports Network poll

The 2004 UC Davis football team represented the University of California, Davis as a member of the Great West Conference (GWC) during the 2004 NCAA Division I-AA football season. Led by 12th-year head coach Bob Biggs, UC Davis compiled an overall record of 6–4 with a mark of 3–2 in conference play, placing second in the GWC. 2004 was the 35th consecutive winning season for the Aggies. The team outscored their opponents 323 to 211 for the season. The Aggies played home games at Toomey Field in Davis, California.

This was the first season that UC Davis competed at the NCAA Division I-AA level.

== Schedule ==
Date	Time	Opponent	Rank	Site	Result	Attendance	Source
September 4		South Dakota State		Toomey Field; Davis, CA	W 52–0		
September 18		at Weber State*		Wildcat Stadium; Ogden, UT	W 31–29	8,301	
September 25		Sacramento State*		Toomey Field; Davis, CA (Causeway Classic)	W 58–23	8,720	
October 2		at Northern Colorado		Nottingham Field; Greeley, CO	W 30–20		
October 9		at Western Oregon*	No. 24	McArthur Field; Monmouth, OR	W 54–2		
October 16	1:00 p.m.	No. 10 Stephen F. Austin*	No. 21	Toomey Field; Davis, CA	L 19–22	7,520	
October 23		at Southern Utah	No. 25	Eccles Coliseum; Cedar City, UT	L 15–19		
October 30		at No. 5 Cal Poly		Mustang Stadium; San Luis Obispo, CA (Battle for the Golden Horseshoe)	W 36–33		
November 13		North Dakota State	No. 21	Toomey Field; Davis, CA	L 7–25	6,720	
November 20		at Portland State*		PGE Park; Portland, OR	L 21–38		
*Non-conference game; Rankings from The Sports Network Poll released prior to the game; All times are in Pacific time

== NFL draft ==
No UC Davis Aggies players were selected in the 2005 NFL draft. The following players finished their UC Davis career in 2004, were not drafted, but played in the NFL:

Player	Position	First NFL team
Brad Lekkerkerker	Tackle	2005 Oakland Raiders
Cory Lekkerkerker	Tackle	2005 San Diego Chargers
