= 2004 Northwestern State Demons football team =

American college football season

2004 Northwestern State Demons football

Southland co-champion

NCAA Division I-AA First Round, L 7–56 at Montana
- Conference: Southland Conference

Ranking
- Sports Network: No. 17
- Record: 8–4 (4–1 Southland)
- Head coach: Scott Stoker (3rd season)
- Defensive coordinator: Brad Laird (2nd season)
- Home stadium: Harry Turpin Stadium

2004 Southland Conference football standings
	Conf.			Overall
Team	W		L	W		L
No. 4 Sam Houston State +^	4	–	1	11	–	3
No. 17 Northwestern State +^	4	–	1	8	–	4
Texas State	3	–	2	5	–	6
Nicholls State	2	–	3	5	–	5
Stephen F. Austin	1	–	4	6	–	4
McNeese State	1	–	4	4	–	7
+ – Conference co-champions; ^ – NCAA Division I-AA playoff participant; Rankings from The Sports Network poll

The 2004 Northwestern State Demons football team represented Northwestern State University as a member of the Southland Conference during the 2004 NCAA Division I-AA football season. Led by third-year head coach Scott Stoker, the Demons compiled an overall record of 8–4 with a mark of 4–1 in conference play, and finished as Southland co-champion with Sam Houston State. Northwestern advanced to the Division I-AA playoffs before losing to Montana. Northwestern State played home games at Harry Turpin Stadium in Natchitoches, Louisiana.

== Schedule ==
Date	Time	Opponent	Rank	Site	TV	Result	Attendance	Source
September 4	7:00 pm	at Louisiana–Lafayette*		Cajun Field; Lafayette, LA		L 7–14	22,117	
September 11	6:00 pm	at Jackson State*		Mississippi Veterans Memorial Stadium; Jackson, MS		W 28–20	10,500	
September 18	6:00 pm	Texas Southern*	No. 21	Harry Turpin Stadium; Natchitoches, LA		W 52–6	13,110	
September 25	4:00 pm	No. 17 Appalachian State*	No. 19	Harry Turpin Stadium; Natchitoches, LA		W 40–35	10,282	
October 2	4:00 pm	Oklahoma Panhandle State*	No. 14	Harry Turpin Stadium; Natchitoches, LA		W 63–14	7,324	
October 16	4:00 pm	McNeese State	No. 11	Harry Turpin Stadium; Natchitoches, LA (rivalry)	SCTN	W 47–17	14,591	
October 21	7:00 pm	at Nicholls State	No. 9	John L. Guidry Stadium; Thibodaux, LA (NSU Challenge)		L 14–40	5,414	
October 30	1:00 pm	at North Dakota State*	No. 15	Fargodome; Fargo, ND		L 17–30	11,113	
November 6	4:00 pm	Texas State	No. 22	Harry Turpin Stadium; Natchitoches, LA	TSAA	W 44–7	5,720	
November 13	4:00 pm	No. 3 Sam Houston State	No. 19	Harry Turpin Stadium; Natchitoches, LA		W 45–27	7,320	
November 20	2:00 pm	at Stephen F. Austin		Homer Bryce Stadium; Nacogdoches, TX (Chief Caddo)		W 37–16	7,765	
November 27	1:00 pm	at No. 7 Montana*	No. 15	Washington–Grizzly Stadium; Missoula, MT (NCAA Division I-AA First Round)	KPAX	L 7–56	16,289	
*Non-conference game; Rankings from The Sports Network Poll released prior to the game; All times are in Central time

== Game summaries ==
=== at Louisiana–Lafayette ===
Northwestern State at Louisiana-Lafayette – Game summary

Quarter	1	2	3	4	Total
Demons	0	7	0	0	7
Ragin' Cajuns	7	7	0	0	14

at Cajun Field, Lafayette, LA

- Date: September 4
- Game time: 7:00 p.m. CST
- Game weather: 82 °F (28 °C); partly cloudy
- Game attendance: 22,117
- Referee: Ross Smith

Game information

First quarter

- ULL - Jerry Babb 2-yard TD run, Sean Comiskey kick good, 5:24 (ULL 7-0)

Second quarter

- ULL - Travis Smothers 7-yard TD pass from Babb, Comiskey kick good, 13:08 (ULL 14-0)
- NSU - Derrick Doyle 17-yard TD pass from Davon Vinson, Tommy Hebert kick good, 0:50 (ULL 14-7)

Top passers

- ULL - Jerry Babb - 17/26, 176 yards, TD, INT
- NSU - Davon Vinson - 12/27, 148 yards, TD, INT

Top rushers

- ULL - Chester Johnson - 14 carries, 63 yards
- NSU - Shelton Sampson - 8 carries, 30 yards

Top receivers

- ULL - Bill Sampy - 3 receptions, 43 yards
- NSU - Toby Zeigler - 4 receptions, 82 yards
