= 2004 Florida Atlantic Owls football team =

American college football season

2004 Florida Atlantic Owls football
- Conference: Independent
- Record: 9–3
- Head coach: Howard Schnellenberger (4th season)
- Offensive coordinator: Larry Seiple (4th season)
- Offensive scheme: Pro-style
- Defensive coordinator: Kirk Hoza (4th season)
- Base defense: 4–3
- Home stadium: Lockhart Stadium

2004 NCAA Division I-AA independents football standings
	Conf.			Overall
Team	W		L	W		L
Florida Atlantic		–		9	–	3
Southeastern Louisiana		–		7	–	4
FIU		–		3	–	7
Savannah State		–		2	–	8

The 2004 Florida Atlantic Owls football team represented Florida Atlantic University (FAU) as an independent during the 2004 NCAA Division I-AA football season. Led by fourth-year head coach Howard Schnellenberger, the Owls compiled a record of 9–3. Florida Atlantic played home games at Lockhart Stadium in Fort Lauderdale, Florida.

== Schedule ==
Date	Time	Opponent	Site	TV	Result	Attendance	Source
September 4	12:05 a.m.	at Hawaii	Aloha Stadium; Halawa, HI	PPV	W 35–28 ^{OT}	39,390	
September 11	7:00 p.m.	at North Texas	Fouts Field; Denton, TX		W 20–13	15,803	
September 18	3:00 p.m.	at Middle Tennessee	Johnny "Red" Floyd Stadium; Murfreesboro, TN	PPV	W 27–20	13,348	
October 9	1:30 p.m.	at Texas State	Bobcat Stadium; San Marcos, TX	FSN	W 20–13	8,314	
October 16	4:00 p.m.	at Northern Colorado	Nottingham Field; Greeley, CO	CSTV	W 39–24	6,481	
October 23	4:00 p.m.	Louisiana–Monroe	Lockhart Stadium; Fort Lauderdale, FL		L 13–17	12,557	
October 30	4:00 p.m.	at Florida A&M	Bragg Memorial Stadium; Tallahassee, FL	CSS	W 38–8	13,436	
November 6	3:30 p.m.	at Troy	Movie Gallery Stadium; Troy, AL		L 6–24	20,515	
November 13	4:00 p.m.	New Mexico State	Lockhart Stadium; Fort Lauderdale, FL		L 7–35	11,628	
November 20	4:00 p.m.	Illinois State	Lockhart Stadium; Fort Lauderdale, FL		W 28–0	8,296	
November 27	4:00 p.m.	Edward Waters	Lockhart Stadium; Fort Lauderdale, FL		W 49–15	5,178	
December 4	4:00 p.m.	vs. FIU	Pro Player Stadium; Miami Gardens, FL (Shula Bowl)		W 17–10	16,262	
All times are in Eastern time

== Game summaries ==
=== At Hawaii ===
Game One: Florida Atlantic at Hawaii

Quarter	1	2	3	4	OT	Total
Owls	0	10	9	9	7	35
Rainbow Warriors	7	7	14	0	0	28

at Aloha Stadium • Halawa, Hawaii

- Date: September 4, 2004
- Game attendance: 39,390
- TV: Pay-per-view
- Source

Game information

First Quarter

- (0:00) HAW TD: Se'e Poumele 6-yard pass from Timmy Chang (Justin Ayat PAT good).

Second Quarter

- (11:14) FAU TD: Jared Allen 1-yard rush (Mark Myers PAT good).
- (6:33) HAW TD: Chad Owens 11-yard pass from Timmy Chang (Justin Ayat PAT good).
- (0:00) FAU FG: Mark Myers 43-yard field goal.

Third Quarter

- (10:08) HAW TD: Michael Brewster 12-yard rush (Justin Ayat PAT good).
- (7:44) FAU FG: Mark Myers 33-yard field goal.
- (4:21) FAU TD: Anthony Crissinger-Hill 3 yard pass from Jared Allen (2-pt. conv. failed)
- (1:57) HAW TD: Michael Brewster 10-yard rush (Justin Ayat PAT good).

Fourth Quarter

- (11:39) FAU FG: Mark Myers 49-yard field goal.
- (0:23) FAU TD: Anthony Crissinger-Hill 31-yard pass from Jared Allen (Mark Myers PAT failed).

Overtime

- (OT) FAU TD: Doug Parker 7-yard rush (Mark Myers PAT good).

Top Passers

- FAU – Jared Allen: 28/44, 291 yds, 2 TD, 2 INT
- HAW – Timmy Chang: 38/66, 302 yds, 2 TD

Top Rushers

- FAU – Doug Parker: 19 car, 86 yds, 1 TD
- HAW – Michael Brewster: 6 car, 26 yds, 2 TD

Top Receiving

- FAU – Anthony Crissinger-Hill: 15 rec, 183 yds, 2 TD
- HAW – Chad Owens: 13 rec, 89 yds, 1 TD
