= 2004 Stephen F. Austin Lumberjacks football team =

American college football season

2004 Stephen F. Austin Lumberjacks football
- Conference: Southland Conference
- Record: 6–5 (1–4 Southland)
- Head coach: Mike Santiago (6th season)
- Defensive coordinator: Kim Dameron (4th season)
- Home stadium: Homer Bryce Stadium

2004 Southland Conference football standings
	Conf.			Overall
Team	W		L	W		L
No. 4 Sam Houston State +^	4	–	1	11	–	3
No. 17 Northwestern State +^	4	–	1	8	–	4
Texas State	3	–	2	5	–	6
Nicholls State	2	–	3	5	–	5
Stephen F. Austin	1	–	4	6	–	4
McNeese State	1	–	4	4	–	7
+ – Conference co-champions; ^ – NCAA Division I-AA playoff participant; Rankings from The Sports Network poll

The 2004 Stephen F. Austin Lumberjacks football team represented Stephen F. Austin State University as a member of the Southland Conference during the 2004 NCAA Division I-AA football season. Led by sixth-year head coach Mike Santiago, the Lumberjacks compiled an overall record of 6–5 with a mark of 1–4 in conference play, tying in last place in the Southland. Stephen F. Austin played home games at Homer Bryce Stadium in Nacogdoches, Texas.

== Schedule ==
Date	Time	Opponent	Rank	Site	Result	Attendance	Source
September 2	7:00 p.m.	Henderson State*		Homer Bryce Stadium; Nacogdoches, TX	W 30–14	7,003	
September 11	7:00 p.m.	Northern Arizona*		Homer Bryce Stadium; Nacogdoches, TX	W 24–17 ^{OT}	8,307	
September 18	4:05 p.m.	at Northern Iowa*	No. 12	UNI-Dome; Cedar Falls, IA	W 24–21	11,957	
September 25	7:00 p.m.	Southern Utah*		Homer Bryce Stadium; Nacogdoches, TX	W 24–21	9,874	
October 9	7:00 p.m.	FIU*	No. 5	Homer Bryce Stadium; Nacogdoches, TX	L 24–31	4,131	
October 16	3:00 p.m.	at No. 21 UC Davis*	No. 10	Toomey Field; Davis, CA	W 22–19	7,520	
October 23	6:00 p.m.	at Texas State		Bobcat Stadium; San Marcos, TX	L 14–17	13,323	
October 30	2:00 p.m.	No. 8 Sam Houston State	No. 13	Homer Bryce Stadium; Nacogdoches, TX (Battle of the Piney Woods)	L 28–31	13,753	
November 6	6:30 p.m.	at Nicholls State	No. 18	John L. Guidry Stadium; Thibodaux, LA	L 23–41	7,637	
November 13	2:30 p.m.	McNeese State		Homer Bryce Stadium; Nacogdoches, TX	W 55–7	8,765	
November 20	2:00 p.m.	Northwestern State		Homer Bryce Stadium; Nacogdoches, TX (Chief Caddo)	L 16–37	7,765	
*Non-conference game; Rankings from The Sports Network Poll released prior to the game; All times are in Central time
