= 2004 Western Illinois Leathernecks football team =

American college football season

2004 Western Illinois Leathernecks football
- Conference: Gateway Football Conference
- Record: 4–7 (2–5 Gateway)
- Head coach: Don Patterson (6th season)
- Offensive coordinator: Mark Hendrickson (6th season)
- Home stadium: Hanson Field

2004 Gateway Football Conference standings
	Conf.			Overall
Team	W		L	W		L
No. 9 Southern Illinois $^	7	–	0	10	–	2
No. 11 Western Kentucky ^	6	–	1	9	–	3
No. 25 Northern Iowa	5	–	2	7	–	4
Southwest Missouri State	3	–	4	6	–	5
Western Illinois	2	–	5	4	–	7
Illinois State	2	–	5	4	–	7
Youngstown State	2	–	5	4	–	7
Indiana State	1	–	6	4	–	7
$ – Conference champion; ^ – NCAA Division I-AA playoff participant; Rankings from The Sports Network poll

The 2004 Western Illinois Leathernecks football team represented Western Illinois University as a member of the Gateway Football Conference in the 2004 NCAA Division I-AA football season. They were led by sixth-year head coach Don Patterson and played their home games at Hanson Field in Macomb, Illinois. The Leathernecks finished the season with a 4–7 record overall and a 2–5 record in conference play.

The team's 98–7 victory over Division II Cheyney broke school and conference records for the most points scored in a game and the largest margin of victory. In addition, running back Travis Glasford broke another school record by scoring six touchdowns, and kicker Justin Langan kicked 14 extra points, one short of the Division I-AA record.

== Schedule ==
Date	Opponent	Rank	Site	Result	Attendance	Source
September 4	at Nebraska*	No. 12	Memorial Stadium; Lincoln, NE	L 17–56	77,471	
September 11	Cheyney*	No. 16	Hanson Field; Macomb, IL	W 98–7	11,773	
September 18	at Hampton*	No. 16	Armstrong Stadium; Hampton, VA	L 20–40	1,705	
September 25	Quincy*		Hanson Field; Macomb, IL	W 38–31	11,102	
October 2	at Southwest Missouri State		Plaster Sports Complex; Springfield, MO	L 31–36	10,082	
October 9	Indiana State		Hanson Field; Macomb, IL	W 29–27	15,216	
October 16	Illinois State		Hanson Field; Macomb, IL	W 40–31	9,867	
October 23	at Northern Iowa		UNI-Dome; Cedar Falls, IA	L 13–36	12,325	
October 30	at No. 1 Southern Illinois		McAndrew Stadium; Carbondale, IL	L 13–66	10,045	
November 6	Youngstown State		Hanson Field; Macomb, IL	L 9–34	15,984	
November 13	at No. 5 Western Kentucky		L. T. Smith Stadium; Bowling Green, KY	L 3–45	7,318	
*Non-conference game; Rankings from The Sports Network Poll released prior to the game
