= 2004 Montana Grizzlies football team =

American college football season

2004 Montana Grizzlies football

Big Sky co-champion

NCAA Division I-AA Championship, L 21–31 vs. James Madison
- Conference: Big Sky Conference

Ranking
- Sports Network: No. 2
- Record: 12–3 (6–1 Big Sky)
- Head coach: Bobby Hauck (2nd season)
- Offensive coordinator: Rob Phenicie (2nd season)
- Defensive coordinator: Kraig Paulson (1st season)
- Home stadium: Washington–Grizzly Stadium

2004 Big Sky Conference football standings
	Conf.			Overall
Team	W		L	W		L
No. 2 Montana $^	6	–	1	12	–	3
No. 8 Eastern Washington ^	6	–	1	9	–	4
Montana State	4	–	3	6	–	5
Portland State	4	–	3	7	–	4
Northern Arizona	3	–	4	4	–	7
Idaho State	2	–	5	3	–	8
Sacramento State	2	–	5	3	–	8
Weber State	1	–	6	1	–	10
$ – Conference champion; ^ – NCAA Division I-AA playoff participant; Rankings from The Sports Network poll

The 2004 Montana Grizzlies football team represented the University of Montana as a member of the Big Sky Conference during the 2004 NCAA Division I-AA football season. Led by second-year head coach Bobby Hauck, the Grizzlies compiled an overall record of 12–3, with a mark of 6–1 in conference play, and finished as Big Sky co-champion. Montana advanced to the NCAA Division I-AA Football Championship playoffs, where the Grizzlies defeated Northwestern State in the first round, New Hampshire in the quarterfinal, Sam Houston State in the semifinal, but lost to James Madison in the NCAA Division I-AA Championship. The team played home games at Washington–Grizzly Stadium in Missoula, Montana.

== Schedule ==
Date	Time	Opponent	Rank	Site	TV	Result	Attendance	Source
September 4	1:00 pm	No. 11 Maine*	No. 3	Washington–Grizzly Stadium; Missoula, MT	KPAX	W 27–20	23,228	
September 11	1:00 pm	Hofstra*	No. 2	Washington–Grizzly Stadium; Missoula, MT	KPAX	W 41–23	23,100	
September 18	6:00 pm	at Sam Houston State*	No. 1	Bowers Stadium; Huntsville, TX		L 29–41	12,941	
September 25	1:00 pm	Northern Colorado	No. 7	Washington–Grizzly Stadium; Missoula, MT	KPAX	W 27–16	23,220	
October 2	6:00 pm	at Weber State	No. 7	Stewart Stadium; Ogden, UT	KPAX	W 42–21	5,139	
October 9	1:00 pm	Idaho State^{†}	No. 7	Washington–Grizzly Stadium; Missoula, MT	KPAX	W 24–22	23,582	
October 16	3:00 pm	at No. 23 Eastern Washington	No. 5	Woodward Field; Cheney, WA (EWU–UM Governors Cup)	KPAX	W 31–28	10,754	
October 30	3:30 pm	at Portland State	No. 4	PGE Park; Portland, OR		L 32–35	8,413	
November 6	12:00 pm	Northern Arizona	No. 10	Washington–Grizzly Stadium; Missoula, MT	KPAX	W 34–22	22,274	
November 13	12:00 pm	Sacramento State	No. 9	Washington–Grizzly Stadium; Missoula, MT		W 52–21	21,097	
November 20	12:00 pm	Montana State	No. 7	Washington–Grizzly Stadium; Missoula, MT (rivalry)	KPAX	W 38–22	23,867	
November 27	12:00 pm	No. 15 Northwestern State*	No. 7	Washington–Grizzly Stadium; Missoula, MT (NCAA Division I-AA First Round)	KPAX	W 56–7	16,289	
December 4	2:00 pm	No. 5 New Hampshire*	No. 7	Washington–Grizzly Stadium; Missoula, MT (NCAA Division I-AA Quarterfinal)	ESPN2	W 47–17	20,919	
December 11	12:30 pm	No. 9 Sam Houston State*	No. 7	Washington–Grizzly Stadium; Missoula, MT (NCAA Division I-AA Semifinal)	ESPN2	W 34–13	23,607	
December 17	6:00 pm	vs. No. 8 James Madison*	No. 7	Finley Stadium; Chattanooga, TN (NCAA Division I-AA Championship)	ESPN2	L 21–31	16,771	
*Non-conference game; ^{†}Homecoming; Rankings from The Sports Network Poll released prior to the game; All times are in Mountain time
