= 2004 Cal Poly Mustangs football team =

American college football season

2004 Cal Poly Mustangs football

GWFC champion
- Conference: Great West Conference

Ranking
- Sports Network: No. 16
- Record: 9–2 (4–1 GWC)
- Head coach: Rich Ellerson (4th season)
- Offensive coordinator: Ian Shields (1st season)
- Co-offensive coordinator: Joe DuPaix (1st season)
- Offensive scheme: Triple option
- Base defense: 4–3
- Home stadium: Mustang Stadium

2004 Great West Conference football standings
	Conf.			Overall
Team	W		L	W		L
No. 16 Cal Poly $	4	–	1	9	–	2
UC Davis	3	–	2	6	–	4
No. 23 North Dakota State	2	–	3	8	–	3
South Dakota State	2	–	3	6	–	5
Southern Utah	2	–	3	6	–	5
Northern Colorado	2	–	3	2	–	9
$ – Conference champion; Rankings from The Sports Network poll

The 2004 Cal Poly Mustangs football team represented California Polytechnic State University, San Luis Obispo as member of the Great West Conference (GWC) during the 2004 NCAA Division I-AA football season. Led by fourth-year head coach Rich Ellerson, Cal Poly compiled an overall record of 9–2 with a mark of 4–1 in conference play, winning the GWC title. The team outscored its opponents 336 to 183 for the season. The Mustangs played home games at Mustang Stadium in San Luis Obispo, California.

Cal Poly was a charter member of the newly-formed GWC. The Mustangs competed as an independent the previous eight seasons.

== Schedule ==
Date	Time	Opponent	Rank	Site	Result	Attendance	Source
September 4		Humboldt State*		Mustang Stadium; San Luis Obispo, CA	W 42–7		
September 11		at Idaho State*		Holt Arena; Pocatello, ID	W 35–20		
September 18		at No. 14 Montana State*	No. 22	Bobcat Stadium; Bozeman, MT	W 27–14	12,337	
October 2		South Dakota State	No. 13	Mustang Stadium; San Luis Obispo, CA	W 14–7		
October 9		at Southern Utah	No. 10	Eccles Coliseum; Cedar City, UT	W 24–17		
October 16		Texas State*	No. 9	Mustang Stadium; San Luis Obispo, CA	W 38–21	9,352	
October 23		at North Dakota State	No. 6	Fargodome; Fargo, ND	W 13–10	11,834	
October 30		UC Davis	No. 5	Mustang Stadium; San Luis Obispo, CA (Battle for the Golden Horseshoe)	L 33–36		
November 6		at No. 21 Eastern Washington*	No. 11	Woodward Field; Cheney, WA	L 21–38		
November 13		Northern Colorado	No. 18	Mustang Stadium; San Luis Obispo, CA	W 31–0		
November 20	4:00 p.m.	at Sacramento State*	No. 18	Hornet Stadium; Sacramento, CA	W 58–13	4,895	
*Non-conference game; Rankings from The Sports Network Poll released prior to the game; All times are in Pacific time

== Team players in the NFL ==
The following Cal Poly Mustang players were selected in the 2005 NFL draft.

Player	Position	Round	Overall	NFL team
Jordan Beck	Linebacker	3	90	Atlanta Falcons
