= 2004 Montana State Bobcats football team =

American college football season

2004 Montana State Bobcats football
- Conference: Big Sky Conference
- Record: 6–5 (4–3 Big Sky)
- Head coach: Mike Kramer (5th season)
- Defensive coordinator: Pete Kwiatkowski (5th season)
- Home stadium: Bobcat Stadium

2004 Big Sky Conference football standings
	Conf.			Overall
Team	W		L	W		L
No. 2 Montana $^	6	–	1	12	–	3
No. 8 Eastern Washington ^	6	–	1	9	–	4
Montana State	4	–	3	6	–	5
Portland State	4	–	3	7	–	4
Northern Arizona	3	–	4	4	–	7
Idaho State	2	–	5	3	–	8
Sacramento State	2	–	5	3	–	8
Weber State	1	–	6	1	–	10
$ – Conference champion; ^ – NCAA Division I-AA playoff participant; Rankings from The Sports Network poll

The 2004 Montana State Bobcats football team was an American football team that represented Montana State University in the Big Sky Conference (Big Sky) during the 2004 NCAA Division I-AA football season. In their fifth season under head coach Mike Kramer, the Bobcats compiled a 6–5 record (4–3 against Big Sky opponents) and tied for third place in the Big Sky. Quarterback Travis Lulay led the team on offense.

== Schedule ==
Date	Time	Opponent	Rank	Site	Result	Attendance	Source
September 11		Adams State*	No. 12	Bobcat Stadium; Bozeman, MT	W 19–0	12,267	
September 18		No. 22 Cal Poly*	No. 14	Bobcat Stadium; Bozeman, MT	L 14–27	12,337	
September 25		at Colorado State*	No. 21	Hughes Stadium; Fort Collins, CO	L 14–39	28,207	
October 2		at Idaho State		Holt Arena; Pocatello, ID	W 17–13	7,028	
October 9		Weber State^{†}		Bobcat Stadium; Bozeman, MT	W 20–17	13,327	
October 16		Portland State		Bobcat Stadium; Bozeman, MT	W 31–24	10,754	
October 23		South Dakota State*		Bobcat Stadium; Bozeman, MT	W 27–24	11,307	
October 30		at Northern Arizona	No. 24	Walkup Skydome; Flagstaff, AZ	W 60–14	6,495	
November 6	5:00 p.m.	at Sacramento State	No. 17	Hornet Stadium; Sacramento, CA	L 28–38	4,838	
November 13		No. 16 Eastern Washington	No. 23	Bobcat Stadium; Bozeman, MT	L 44–51	12,907	
November 20		at No. 7 Montana		Washington–Grizzly Stadium; Missoula, MT (rivalry)	L 22–38	23,867	
*Non-conference game; ^{†}Homecoming; Rankings from The Sports Network Poll released prior to the game; All times are in Mountain time
