= 2004 North Dakota State Bison football team =

American college football season

2004 North Dakota State Bison football
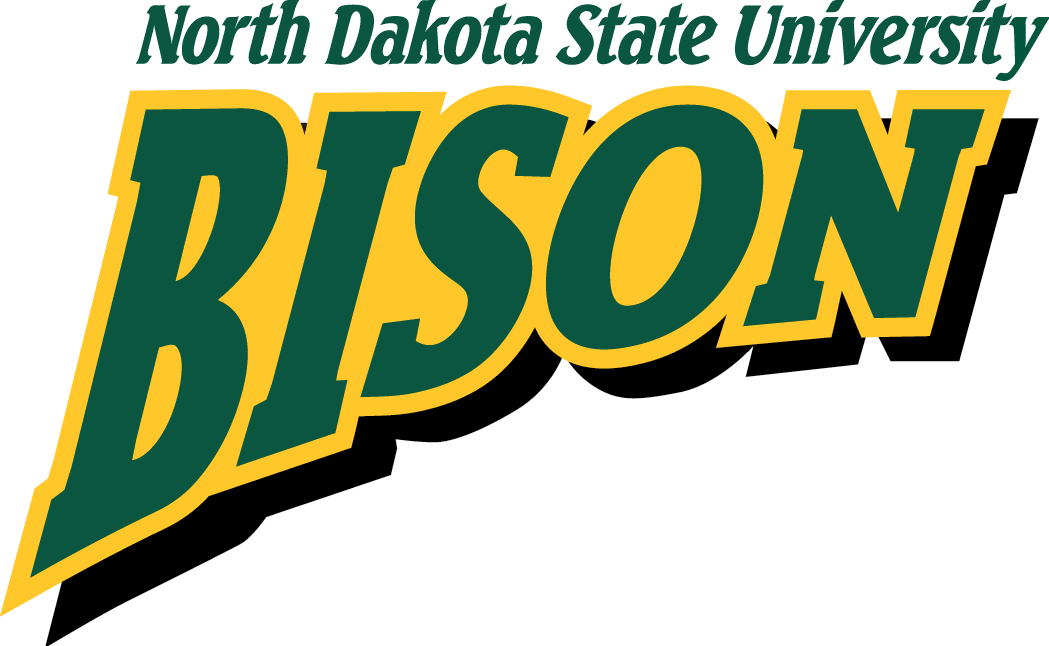
- Conference: Great West Conference

Ranking
- Sports Network: No. 23
- Record: 8–3 (2–3 Great West)
- Head coach: Craig Bohl (2nd season)
- Offensive coordinator: Tim Albin (1st season)
- Offensive scheme: Pro spread
- Defensive coordinator: Jim Burrow (2nd season)
- Base defense: 4–3
- Home stadium: Fargodome

2004 Great West Conference football standings
	Conf.			Overall
Team	W		L	W		L
No. 16 Cal Poly $	4	–	1	9	–	2
UC Davis	3	–	2	6	–	4
No. 23 North Dakota State	2	–	3	8	–	3
South Dakota State	2	–	3	6	–	5
Southern Utah	2	–	3	6	–	5
Northern Colorado	2	–	3	2	–	9
$ – Conference champion; Rankings from The Sports Network poll

The 2004 North Dakota State Bison football team represented North Dakota State University in the 2004 NCAA Division I-AA football season. It was the program's first season competing at the NCAA Division I-AA level. The Bison were led by second-year head coach Craig Bohl and played their home games at the Fargodome in Fargo, North Dakota. They finished the season with an overall record of 8–3 and tied for third in the Great West Conference with a 2–3 mark. North Dakota State was ineligible for the NCAA Division I-AA playoffs per NCAA rules, during their first four seasons at the NCAA Division I-AA/FCS level.

During the regular season, the Bison were never ranked in The Sports Network poll, but beat two of the three top-25 teams they played. After the playoffs, the Bison were ranked #24 in the final rankings. During their first four years in Division I-AA (2004–2007), NDSU had a record of 35–9 (.795) and were ranked in the top-25 32 out of 44 weeks.

== Schedule ==
Date	Time	Opponent	Site	Result	Attendance	Source
August 28	6:00 pm	Valparaiso*	Fargodome; Fargo, ND	W 52–0	18,665	
September 4	2:10 pm	at Northern Colorado	Nottingham Field; Greeley, CO	L 13–15	5,311	
September 11	6:00 pm	Montana Tech*	Fargodome; Fargo, ND	W 56–3	11,030	
September 18	6:00 pm	Carson–Newman*	Fargodome; Fargo, ND	W 49–19	11,523	
October 2	4:00 pm	at Nicholls State*	John L. Guidry Stadium; Thibodaux, LA (Trees Bowl)	W 24–14	5,421	
October 9	6:40 pm	at South Dakota State	Coughlin-Alumni Stadium; Brookings, SD (Dakota Marker)	L 21–24	12,323	
October 16	1:00 pm	Southern Utah	Fargodome; Fargo, ND	W 27–21	15,449	
October 23	1:00 pm	No. 6 Cal Poly	Fargodome; Fargo, ND	L 10–13	11,834	
October 30	1:00 pm	No. 15 Northwestern State*	Fargodome; Fargo, ND	W 30–17	11,113	
November 6	1:00 pm	at Weber State*	Stewart Stadium; Ogden, UT	W 31–17	4,112	
November 13	1:05 pm	No. 21 UC Davis	Toomey Field; Davis, CA	W 25–7	6,720	
*Non-conference game; Rankings from The Sports Network Poll released prior to the game; All times are in Central time
