= 2004 Western Kentucky Hilltoppers football team =

American college football season

2004 Western Kentucky Hilltoppers football

NCAA Division I-AA First Round, L 24–54 at Sam Houston State
- Conference: Gateway Football Conference

Ranking
- Sports Network: No. 11
- Record: 9–3 (6–1 Gateway)
- Head coach: David Elson (2nd season)
- Offensive coordinator: T. J. Weist (2nd season)
- Offensive scheme: Multiple
- Defensive coordinator: Mike Dietzel (1st season)
- Base defense: 3–4
- Home stadium: L. T. Smith Stadium

2004 Gateway Football Conference standings
	Conf.			Overall
Team	W		L	W		L
No. 9 Southern Illinois $^	7	–	0	10	–	2
No. 11 Western Kentucky ^	6	–	1	9	–	3
No. 25 Northern Iowa	5	–	2	7	–	4
Southwest Missouri State	3	–	4	6	–	5
Western Illinois	2	–	5	4	–	7
Illinois State	2	–	5	4	–	7
Youngstown State	2	–	5	4	–	7
Indiana State	1	–	6	4	–	7
$ – Conference champion; ^ – NCAA Division I-AA playoff participant; Rankings from The Sports Network poll

The 2004 Western Kentucky Hilltoppers football team represented Western Kentucky University in the 2004 NCAA Division I-AA football season and were led by second-year head coach David Elson. The team contended for Gateway Football Conference championship but finished 2nd. They made the school's fifth straight appearance in the NCAA Division I-AA playoffs; it would end up being WKU's last playoff appearance, as they would initiate transitioning to NCAA Division I-A/FBS in 2006. The Hilltoppers finished the season ranked 11th in final I-AA postseason national poll.

This team included future National Football League (NFL) players Curtis Hamilton, Brian Claybourn, Dan Cline, and Greg Ryan. Claybourn and Buster Ashley were named to the AP All American team. The All-Conference team included Ashley, Claybourn, Deonté Smith, Charles Thompson, Antonio Thomas, Justin Haddix, Erik Losey, Lerron Moore, and Joe Woolridge.

== Schedule ==
Date	Opponent	Rank	Site	Result	Attendance	Source
September 4	at No. 13 (I-A) Kansas State*	No. 13	KSU Stadium; Manhattan, KS	L 13–27	46,740	
September 11	Concord*	No. 11	L. T. Smith Stadium; Bowling Green, KY	W 58–0	10,390	
September 18	at No. 20 Eastern Kentucky*	No. 11	Roy Kidd Stadium; Richmond, KY (Battle of the Bluegrass)	W 21–8	22,700	
October 2	Youngstown State	No. 6	L. T. Smith Stadium; Bowling Green, KY	W 44–19	11,619	
October 9	at No. 22 Northern Iowa	No. 6	UNI-Dome; Cedar Falls, IA	W 17–10	12,184	
October 16	at No. 1 Southern Illinois	No. 4	Saluki Stadium; Carbondale, IL	L 10–38	10,143	
October 23	Indiana State^{†}	No. 10	L. T. Smith Stadium; Bowling Green, KY	W 31–9	7,390	
October 30	Illinois State	No. 7	L. T. Smith Stadium; Bowling Green, KY	W 24–21	7,126	
November 6	at Southwest Missouri State	No. 5	Plaster Sports Complex; Springfield, MO	W 28–24	8,942	
November 13	Western Illinois	No. 5	L. T. Smith Stadium; Bowling Green, KY	W 45–3	7,318	
November 20	at FIU*	No. 3	Riccardo Silva Stadium; Miami, FL	W 35–14	3,108	
November 27	at No. 4 Sam Houston State*	No. 11	Bowers Stadium; Huntsville, TX (NCAA Division I-AA First Round)	L 24–54	9,554	
*Non-conference game; ^{†}Homecoming; Rankings from The Sports Network Poll released prior to the game
