= 2004 Eastern Washington Eagles football team =

American college football season

2004 Eastern Washington Eagles football

Big Sky co-champion

NCAA Division I-AA Quarterfinal, L 34–35 vs. Sam Houston State
- Conference: Big Sky Conference

Ranking
- Sports Network: No. 8
- Record: 9–4 (6–1 Big Sky)
- Head coach: Paul Wulff (5th season)
- Offensive coordinator: Beau Baldwin (2nd season)
- Defensive coordinator: Jody Sears (2nd season)
- Home stadium: Woodward Field

2004 Big Sky Conference football standings
	Conf.			Overall
Team	W		L	W		L
No. 2 Montana $^	6	–	1	12	–	3
No. 8 Eastern Washington ^	6	–	1	9	–	4
Montana State	4	–	3	6	–	5
Portland State	4	–	3	7	–	4
Northern Arizona	3	–	4	4	–	7
Idaho State	2	–	5	3	–	8
Sacramento State	2	–	5	3	–	8
Weber State	1	–	6	1	–	10
$ – Conference champion; ^ – NCAA Division I-AA playoff participant; Rankings from The Sports Network poll

The 2004 Eastern Washington Eagles football team represented Eastern Washington University as a member of the Big Sky Conference during the 2004 NCAA Division I-AA football season. Led by fifth-year head coach Paul Wulff, the Eagles compiled an overall record of 9–4, with a mark of 6–1 in conference play, and finished as Big Sky co-champion. Eastern Washington advanced to the NCAA Division I-AA Football Championship playoffs, where the Eagles defeated Southern Illinois in the first round and lost to Sam Houston State in the quarterfinal. The team played home games at Woodward Field in Cheney, Washington.

== Schedule ==
Date	Opponent	Rank	Site	Result	Attendance	Source
September 2	at Nicholls State*		John L. Guidry Stadium; Thibodaux, LA	L 14–37	4,731	
September 11	at Air Force*		Falcon Stadium; Colorado Springs, CO	L 20–42	34,389	
September 18	Central Washington*		Woodward Field; Cheney, WA	W 39–8	6,425	
September 25	Idaho State		Woodward Field; Cheney, WA	W 47–22	5,581	
October 2	at Portland State		PGE Park; Portland, OR (rivalry)	W 41–21		
October 9	No. 16 Northern Arizona		Woodward Field; Cheney, WA	W 45–14	5,171	
October 16	No. 5 Montana	No. 23	Woodward Field; Cheney, WA (EWU–UM Governors Cup)	L 28–31	10,754	
October 23	at Weber State		Stewart Stadium; Ogden, UT	W 51–7	4,623	
October 30	Sacramento State	No. 25	Woodward Field; Cheney, WA	W 45–10	5,305	
November 6	No. 11 Cal Poly*	No. 21	Woodward Field; Cheney, WA	W 38–21		
November 13	at No. 23 Montana State	No. 16	Bobcat Stadium; Bozeman, MT	W 51–44	12,907	
November 27	at No. 1 Southern Illinois*	No. 14	McAndrew Stadium; Carbondale, IL (NCAA Division I-AA First Round)	W 35–31	7,304	
December 4	No. 9 Sam Houston State*	No. 14	Woodward Field; Cheney, WA (NCAA Division I-AA Quarterfinal)	L 34–35	7,633	
*Non-conference game; Rankings from The Sports Network Poll released prior to the game
