= 2004 Northern Iowa Panthers football team =

American college football season

2004 Northern Iowa Panthers football
- Conference: Gateway Football Conference

Ranking
- Sports Network: No. 25
- Record: 7–4 (5–2 Gateway)
- Head coach: Mark Farley (4th season)
- Offensive coordinator: Bill Salmon (4th season)
- Co-defensive coordinator: Bill Ennis-Inge (1st season)
- Home stadium: UNI-Dome

2004 Gateway Football Conference standings
	Conf.			Overall
Team	W		L	W		L
No. 9 Southern Illinois $^	7	–	0	10	–	2
No. 11 Western Kentucky ^	6	–	1	9	–	3
No. 25 Northern Iowa	5	–	2	7	–	4
Southwest Missouri State	3	–	4	6	–	5
Western Illinois	2	–	5	4	–	7
Illinois State	2	–	5	4	–	7
Youngstown State	2	–	5	4	–	7
Indiana State	1	–	6	4	–	7
$ – Conference champion; ^ – NCAA Division I-AA playoff participant; Rankings from The Sports Network poll

The 2004 Northern Iowa Panthers football team represented the University of Northern Iowa as a member of the Gateway Football Conference during the 2004 NCAA Division I-AA football season. Led by fourth-year head coach Mark Farley, the Panthers compiled an overall record of 7–4 with a mark of 5–2 record in conference play, placing third in the Gateway. Northern Iowa played home games at the UNI-Dome in Cedar Falls, Iowa.

== Schedule ==
Date	Time	Opponent	Rank	Site	Result	Attendance	Source
September 4	1:00 pm	at Iowa State*		Jack Trice Stadium; Ames, IA	L 0–23	42,865	
September 11	4:05 pm	Minnesota State–Mankato*		UNI-Dome; Cedar Falls, IA	W 40–0	7,058	
September 18	4:05 pm	No. 12 Stephen F. Austin*		UNI-Dome; Cedar Falls, IA	L 21–24	11,957	
October 2	1:30 pm	at No. 1 Southern Illinois	No. 15	McAndrew Stadium; Carbondale, IL	L 36–40	12,326	
October 9	4:05 pm	No. 6 Western Kentucky	No. 22	UNI-Dome; Cedar Falls, IA	L 10–17	12,184	
October 16	3:00 pm	at Youngstown State		Stambaugh Stadium; Youngstown, OH	W 22–20	15,937	
October 23	3:05 pm	Western Illinois		UNI-Dome; Cedar Falls, IA	W 36–13	12,325	
October 30	4:05 pm	Southwest Missouri State		UNI-Dome; Cedar Falls, IA	W 42–20	6,152	
November 6	12:30 pm	at Indiana State		Memorial Stadium; Terre Haute, IN	W 58–6	5,261	
November 13	5:05 pm	Illinois State		UNI-Dome; Cedar Falls, IA	W 41–14	9,569	
November 20	7:05 pm	at Northern Arizona*		Walkup Skydome; Flagstaff, AZ	W 45–21	5,942	
*Non-conference game; Rankings from The Sports Network Poll released prior to the game; All times are in Central time
