= 2004 McNeese State Cowboys football team =

American college football season

2004 McNeese State Cowboys football
- Conference: Southland Conference
- Record: 4–7 (1–4 Southland)
- Head coach: Tommy Tate (5th season)
- Offensive coordinator: Matt Viator (5th season)
- Home stadium: Cowboy Stadium

2004 Southland Conference football standings
	Conf.			Overall
Team	W		L	W		L
No. 4 Sam Houston State +^	4	–	1	11	–	3
No. 17 Northwestern State +^	4	–	1	8	–	4
Texas State	3	–	2	5	–	6
Nicholls State	2	–	3	5	–	5
Stephen F. Austin	1	–	4	6	–	4
McNeese State	1	–	4	4	–	7
+ – Conference co-champions; ^ – NCAA Division I-AA playoff participant; Rankings from The Sports Network poll

The 2004 McNeese State Cowboys football team was an American football team that represented McNeese State University as a member of the Southland Conference (Southland) during the 2004 NCAA Division I-AA football season. In their fifth year under head coach Tommy Tate, the team compiled an overall record of 4–7, with a mark of 1–4 in conference play, and finished tied for fifth in the Southland.

== Schedule ==
Date	Opponent	Rank	Site	Result	Attendance	Source
September 4	at Southern*	No. 8	A. W. Mumford Stadium; Baton Rouge, LA	W 35–18	21,673	
September 11	Southeastern Louisiana*	No. 6	Cowboy Stadium; Lake Charles, LA	L 17–51	16,499	
September 18	Youngstown State*	No. 17	Cowboy Stadium; Lake Charles, LA	W 24–20	14,029	
September 25	at Portland State*	No. 12	PGE Park; Portland, OR	L 14–35	6,802	
October 2	Southern Utah*	No. 23	Cowboy Stadium; Lake Charles, LA	L 14–56	11,007	
October 16	at No. 11 Northwestern State		Harry Turpin Stadium; Natchitoches, LA (rivalry)	L 17–47	14,591	
October 23	at FIU*		FIU Stadium; Miami, FL	W 30–27	8,457	
October 30	Texas State		Cowboy Stadium; Lake Charles, LA	L 27–54	11,625	
November 6	at No. 4 Sam Houston State		Bowers Stadium; Huntsville, TX	L 47–52	8,152	
November 13	at Stephen F. Austin		Homer Bryce Stadium; Nacogdoches, TX	L 7–55	8,765	
November 20	Nicholls State		Cowboy Stadium; Lake Charles, LA	W 30–9	7,400	
*Non-conference game; Rankings from The Sports Network Poll released prior to the game
