= 2004 Florida A&M Rattlers football team =

American college football season

2004 Florida A&M Rattlers football
- Conference: Independent
- Record: 3–8
- Head coach: Billy Joe (11th season)
- Offensive coordinator: Donnie Duncan (1st season)
- Offensive scheme: Gulf Coast
- Defensive coordinator: Derek Hill (2nd season)
- Base defense: 4–3
- Home stadium: Bragg Memorial Stadium

2004 NCAA Division I-A independents football records
	Conf.			Overall
Team	W		L	W		L
No. 24 Navy		–		10	–	2
Notre Dame		–		6	–	6
Florida A&M		–		3	–	8
Rankings from AP Poll

The 2004 Florida A&M Rattlers football team represented Florida A&M University as an independent during the 2004 NCAA Division I-A football season. Led by 11th-year head coach Billy Joe, the Rattlers compiled an overall record of 3–8.

Florida A&M competed as an independent for the season after a failed attempt to move up to Division I-A. They returned to the Mid-Eastern Athletic Conference (MEAC) for the 2005 season.

== Schedule ==
Date	Time	Opponent	Site	TV	Result	Attendance	Source
September 4	6:00 p.m.	at Illinois	Memorial Stadium; Champaign, IL	ESPN Plus	L 13–52	46,106	
September 11	7:00 p.m.	at Tulane	Louisiana Superdome; New Orleans, LA		L 19–39	23,214	
September 18	2:00 p.m.	at Temple	Lincoln Financial Field; Philadelphia, PA		L 7–38	17,104	
September 25	3:00 p.m.	vs. Tennessee State	Georgia Dome; Atlanta, GA (Atlanta Football Classic)		W 21–15	67,712	
October 2	7:00 p.m.	Virginia Union	Bragg Memorial Stadium; Tallahassee, FL		W 35–10	11,098	
October 9	7:00 p.m.	Nicholls State	Bragg Memorial Stadium; Tallahassee, FL		L 25–42	8,196	
October 16	1:00 p.m.	at Virginia Tech	Lane Stadium; Blacksburg, VA		L 0–62	65,115	
October 23	3:00 p.m.	Savannah State^{†}	Bragg Memorial Stadium; Tallahassee, FL		W 50–14	24,163	
October 30	4:00 p.m.	Florida Atlantic	Bragg Memorial Stadium; Tallahassee, FL	CSS	L 8–38	13,436	
November 20	4:00 p.m.	vs. Bethune–Cookman	Florida Citrus Bowl; Orlando, FL (Florida Classic)		L 52–58 ^{OT}	71,153	
November 27	1:00 p.m.	at FIU	Miami Orange Bowl; Miami, FL		L 23–40	21,010	
^{†}Homecoming; All times are in Eastern time

== Game summaries ==
=== At Illinois ===
	1	2	3	4	Total
Rattlers	0	0	0	13	13
Fighting Illini	7	24	21	0	52

Statistics	FAMU	ILL
First downs	21	26
Total yards	358	554
Rushing yards	71	296
Passing yards	287	258
Turnovers	3	0
Time of possession	29:26	30:34

Team	Category	Player	Statistics
Florida A&M	Passing	Ben Dougherty	22/34, 144 yards, 2 INT
Florida A&M	Rushing	Josh Driscoll	8 rushes, 40 yards, 2 TD
Florida A&M	Receiving	Derek Williams	3 receptions, 59 yards
Illinois	Passing	Jon Beutjer	16/18, 228 yards, TD
Illinois	Rushing	Pierre Thomas	14 rushes, 143 yards, 2 TD
Illinois	Receiving	Kendrick Jones	3 receptions, 101 yards

=== At Tulane ===
	1	2	3	4	Total
Rattlers	6	7	0	6	19
Green Wave	6	19	7	7	39

Statistics	FAMU	TULN
First downs	23	23
Total yards	388	457
Rushing yards	74	233
Passing yards	314	224
Turnovers	1	3
Time of possession	30:42	29:18

Team	Category	Player	Statistics
Florida A&M	Passing	Ben Dougherty	17/22, 177 yards, 2 TD
Florida A&M	Rushing	Rashard Pompey	16 rushes, 59 yards
Florida A&M	Receiving	Roosevelt Kiser	8 receptions, 96 yards, TD
Tulane	Passing	Lester Ricard	12/16, 174 yards, 2 TD, INT
Tulane	Rushing	Jovon Jackson	19 rushes, 134 yards, 3 TD
Tulane	Receiving	Carl Davis	3 receptions, 40 yards, TD

=== At Temple ===
	1	2	3	4	Total
Rattlers	7	0	0	0	7
Owls	17	7	7	7	38

Statistics	FAMU	TEM
First downs	19	25
Total yards	347	477
Rushing yards	118	255
Passing yards	229	222
Turnovers	1	1
Time of possession	26:00	34:00

Team	Category	Player	Statistics
Florida A&M	Passing	Ben Dougherty	22/43, 181 yards
Florida A&M	Rushing	Rashard Pompey	8 rushes, 56 yards, TD
Florida A&M	Receiving	Ronnie Thomas	7 receptions, 76 yards
Temple	Passing	Walter Washington	16/26, 222 yards, TD
Temple	Rushing	Walter Washington	21 rushes, 119 yards, 2 TD
Temple	Receiving	Ikey Chuku	5 receptions, 115 yards, TD

=== Vs. Tennessee State ===
	1	2	3	4	Total
Tigers	0	13	0	2	15
Rattlers	0	6	0	15	21

Statistics	TNST	FAMU
First downs	17	25
Total yards	324	403
Rushing yards	161	63
Passing yards	163	340
Turnovers	3	2
Time of possession	27:24	32:36

Team	Category	Player	Statistics
Tennessee State	Passing	Bryson Rosser	10/20, 122 yards, TD, 2 INT
Tennessee State	Rushing	Charles Anthony	31 rushes, 155 yards, TD
Tennessee State	Receiving	Kevin Hollis	3 receptions, 70 yards
Florida A&M	Passing	Ben Dougherty	30/47, 340 yards, 3 TD, INT
Florida A&M	Rushing	Rashard Pompey	16 rushes, 67 yards
Florida A&M	Receiving	Roosevelt Kiser	13 receptions, 181 yards, 2 TD

=== Virginia Union ===
	1	2	3	4	Total
Panthers	7	3	0	0	10
Rattlers	6	8	7	14	35

Statistics	VUU	FAMU
First downs	17	23
Total yards	325	415
Rushing yards	117	150
Passing yards	208	265
Turnovers	2	1
Time of possession	33:27	26:33

Team	Category	Player	Statistics
Virginia Union	Passing	Micha Henderson	9/14, 106 yards, TD
Virginia Union	Rushing	Cordell Roane	10 rushes, 53 yards
Virginia Union	Receiving	Michael Dolby	5 receptions, 75 yards
Florida A&M	Passing	Ben Dougherty	20/31, 265 yards, 3 TD
Florida A&M	Rushing	Rashard Pompey	14 rushes, 65 yards, TD
Florida A&M	Receiving	Roosevelt Kiser	4 receptions, 102 yards, TD

=== Nicholls State ===
	1	2	3	4	Total
Colonels	7	14	21	0	42
Rattlers	0	13	6	6	25

Statistics	NICH	FAMU
First downs	20	31
Total yards	313	511
Rushing yards	313	221
Passing yards	0	290
Turnovers	0	2
Time of possession	34:27	25:33

Team	Category	Player	Statistics
Nicholls State	Passing	None	
Nicholls State	Rushing	Broderick Cole	17 rushes, 97 yards, 2 TD
Nicholls State	Receiving	None	
Florida A&M	Passing	Ben Dougherty	16/29, 175 yards, INT
Florida A&M	Rushing	Rashard Pompey	19 rushes, 110 yards, 3 TD
Florida A&M	Receiving	Rod Miller	8 receptions, 132 yards

=== At Virginia Tech ===
	1	2	3	4	Total
Rattlers	0	0	0	0	0
Hokies	24	24	14	0	62

Statistics	FAMU	VT
First downs	13	29
Total yards	199	483
Rushing yards	60	310
Passing yards	139	173
Turnovers	5	1
Time of possession	29:07	30:53

Team	Category	Player	Statistics
Florida A&M	Passing	Josh Driscoll	8/12, 77 yards
Florida A&M	Rushing	Ben Dougherty	20 rushes, 45 yards
Florida A&M	Receiving	Ronald Wright	5 receptions, 47 yards
Virginia Tech	Passing	Bryan Randall	9/14, 115 yards, 4 TD
Virginia Tech	Rushing	Cedric Humes	17 rushes, 120 yards, 2 TD
Virginia Tech	Receiving	David Clowney	2 receptions, 34 yards, TD

=== Savannah State ===
	1	2	3	4	Total
Tigers	0	0	6	8	14
Rattlers	6	30	14	0	50

Statistics	SVST	FAMU
First downs	29	28
Total yards	493	626
Rushing yards	164	257
Passing yards	329	369
Turnovers	4	2
Time of possession	35:46	24:14

Team	Category	Player	Statistics
Savannah State	Passing	Clyde Tullis	22/38, 329 yards, 2 TD, INT
Savannah State	Rushing	Myshun McAlpine	21 rushes, 76 yards
Savannah State	Receiving	Khalil Haskin	7 receptions, 114 yards, TD
Florida A&M	Passing	Ben Dougherty	14/19, 260 yards, 4 TD
Florida A&M	Rushing	Rashard Pompey	5 rushes, 65 yards
Florida A&M	Receiving	Rod Miller	5 receptions, 105 yards

=== Florida Atlantic ===
	1	2	3	4	Total
Owls	7	10	14	7	38
Rattlers	0	0	0	8	8

Statistics	FAU	FAMU
First downs	25	21
Total yards	591	342
Rushing yards	276	103
Passing yards	315	239
Turnovers	1	3
Time of possession	32:03	27:57

Team	Category	Player	Statistics
Florida Atlantic	Passing	Jared Allen	9/20, 224 yards, 2 TD, INT
Florida Atlantic	Rushing	Doug Parker	18 rushes, 79 yards, TD
Florida Atlantic	Receiving	Anthony Crissinger-Hill	6 receptions, 163 yards, 2 TD
Florida A&M	Passing	Ben Dougherty	20/36, 194 yards, TD, INT
Florida A&M	Rushing	Ben Dougherty	11 rushes, 55 yards
Florida A&M	Receiving	Rod Miller	8 receptions, 82 yards

=== Vs. Bethune–Cookman ===
	1	2	3	4	OT	Total
Rattlers	21	17	14	0	0	52
Wildcats	7	14	17	14	6	58

Statistics	FAMU	BCU
First downs	30	29
Total yards	598	554
Rushing yards	136	229
Passing yards	462	325
Turnovers	2	3
Time of possession	28:32	31:28

Team	Category	Player	Statistics
Florida A&M	Passing	Ben Dougherty	25/46, 462 yards, 6 TD, INT
Florida A&M	Rushing	Rashard Pompey	19 rushes, 86 yards, TD
Florida A&M	Receiving	Roosevelt Kiser	5 receptions, 197 yards, 2 TD
Bethune–Cookman	Passing	Jimmie Russell	17/26, 325 yards, TD
Bethune–Cookman	Rushing	Jimmie Russell	23 rushes, 101 yards, TD
Bethune–Cookman	Receiving	Eric Weems	9 receptions, 116 yards

=== At FIU ===
	1	2	3	4	Total
Rattlers	6	0	8	9	23
Golden Panthers	2	24	7	7	40

Statistics	FAMU	FIU
First downs	31	14
Total yards	546	279
Rushing yards	110	98
Passing yards	436	181
Turnovers	6	0
Time of possession	30:50	29:10

Team	Category	Player	Statistics
Florida A&M	Passing	Ben Dougherty	45/60, 436 yards, 2 INT
Florida A&M	Rushing	Ben Dougherty	20 rushes, 87 yards, 3 TD
Florida A&M	Receiving	Ronald Wright	10 receptions, 136 yards
FIU	Passing	Josh Padrick	13/26, 181 yards, 2 TD
FIU	Rushing	Rashod Smith	25 rushes, 109 yards, TD
FIU	Receiving	Cory McKinney	4 receptions, 108 yards, 2 TD
