= 2004 Southeastern Louisiana Lions football team =

American college football season

2004 Southeastern Louisiana Lions football
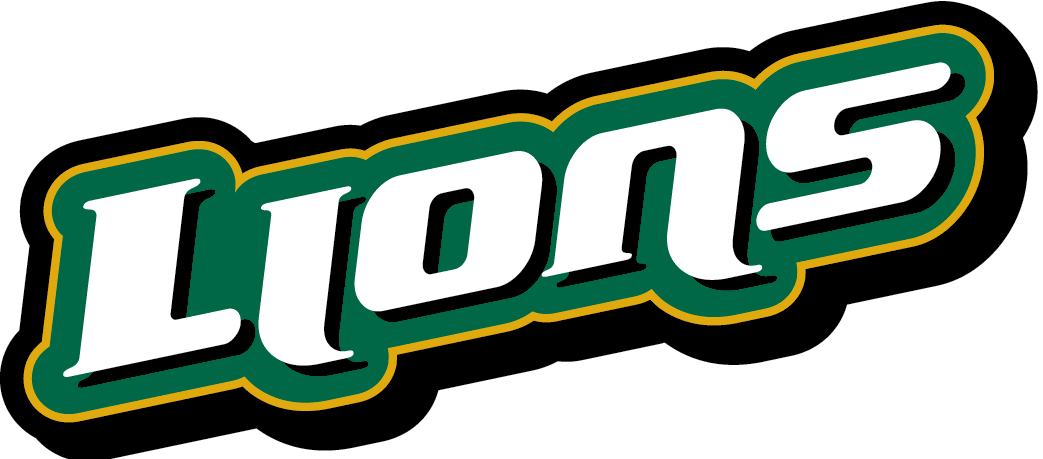
- Conference: Independent
- Record: 7–4
- Head coach: Hal Mumme (2nd season)
- Offensive coordinator: Gary Goff (2nd season)
- Offensive scheme: Air raid
- Defensive coordinator: Woody Widenhofer (2nd season)
- Base defense: 4–3
- Home stadium: Strawberry Stadium

2004 NCAA Division I-AA independents football standings
	Conf.			Overall
Team	W		L	W		L
Florida Atlantic		–		9	–	3
Southeastern Louisiana		–		7	–	4
FIU		–		3	–	7
Savannah State		–		2	–	8

The 2004 Southeastern Louisiana Lions football team represented Southeastern Louisiana University during the 2004 NCAA Division I-AA football season. Led by second-year head coach Hal Mumme, the Lions compiled an overall record of 7–4. Southeastern Louisiana played home games at Strawberry Stadium in Hammond, Louisiana.

== Schedule ==
Date	Time	Opponent	Site	Result	Attendance	Source
September 2	7:00 p.m.	Arkansas–Monticello	Strawberry Stadium; Hammond, LA	W 46–32	9,078	
September 11	7:00 p.m.	at No. 6 McNeese State	Cowboy Stadium; Lake Charles, LA	W 51–17	16,499	
September 18	6:00 p.m.	at Texas State	Bobcat Stadium; San Marcos, TX	L 28–31 ^{2OT}	13,114	
September 25	6:00 p.m.	No. 24 Sam Houston State	Strawberry Stadium; Hammond, LA	L 17–45	9,480	
October 2	6:00 p.m.	Mississippi Valley State	Strawberry Stadium; Hammond, LA	W 33–17	9,021	
October 9	6:00 p.m.	Northern Colorado	Strawberry Stadium; Hammond, LA	W 26–13	8,322	
October 16	6:00 p.m.	Mercyhurst	Strawberry Stadium; Hammond, LA	W 58–14	8,517	
October 30	6:00 p.m.	Alcorn State	Strawberry Stadium; Hammond, LA	L 27–33	9,137	
November 6	12:30 p.m.	at Jacksonville	D. B. Milne Field; Jacksonville, FL	W 51–3	2,162	
November 11	7:00 p.m.	Texas College	Strawberry Stadium; Hammond, LA	W 54–14	7,768	
November 20	12:30 p.m.	at Gardner–Webb	Ernest W. Spangler Stadium; Boiling Springs, NC	L 34–52	3,841	
Rankings from The Sports Network Poll released prior to the game; All times are in Central time
