= 2004 NCAA Division I-AA football rankings =

The 2004 NCAA Division I-AA football rankings are from the Sports Network poll of Division I-AA head coaches, athletic directors, sports information directors and media members. This is for the 2004 season.

== Legend ==
	Increase in ranking
	Decrease in ranking
	Not ranked previous week
(#–#)	Win–loss record
(Italics)	Number of first place votes
т	Tied with team above or below also with this symbol

== The Sports Network poll ==
	Preseason	Week 1 Sept 7	Week 2 Sept 14	Week 3 Sept 21	Week 4 Sept 28	Week 5 Oct 5	Week 6 Oct 12	Week 7 Oct 19	Week 8 Oct 26	Week 9 Nov 2	Week 10 Nov 9	Week 11 Nov 16	Week 12 Nov 23	Week 13 Postseason	
1.	Delaware (57)	Southern Illinois (1–0) (56)	Montana (2–0) (61)	Southern Illinois (2–1) (59)	Southern Illinois (3–1) (71)	Southern Illinois (4–1) (66)	Southern Illinois (5–1) (85)	Southern Illinois (6–1) (73)	Southern Illinois (7–1) (79)	Southern Illinois (8–1) (79)	Southern Illinois (9–1) (102)	Southern Illinois (10–1) (105)	Southern Illinois (10–1) (72)	James Madison (13–2) (67)	1.
2.	Southern Illinois (7)	Montana (1–0) (17)	Southern Illinois (1–1) (26)	Furman (3–0) (30)	Furman (3–1) (15)	Furman (4–1) (18)	Georgia Southern (5–1) (17)	Georgia Southern (6–1) (19)	Georgia Southern (7–1) (17)	Georgia Southern (8–1) (28)	Furman (7–2) (3)	Furman (8–2) (3)	Furman (9–2) (2)	Montana (12–3)	2.
3.	Montana (3)	Wofford (0–0) (5)	Wofford (1–0) (6)	Georgia Southern (2–1) (10)	Georgia Southern (3–1) (10)	Georgia Southern (4–1) (6)	Delaware (4–1) (1)	Delaware (5–1) (2)	Delaware (6–1) (4)	Furman (6–2)	Sam Houston State (8–1) (1)	Western Kentucky (8–2)	Western Kentucky (9–2)	William & Mary (11–3)	3.
4.	Wofford (1)	Colgate (0–0) (2)	Furman (2–0) (3)	Delaware (2–1)	Delaware (3–1) (1)	Delaware (4–1)	Western Kentucky (4–1) (2)	Montana (6–1) (1)	Montana (6–1)	Sam Houston State (7–1)	James Madison (8–1) (1)	Georgia Southern (9–2)	Georgia Southern (9–2)	Sam Houston State (11–3)	4.
5.	Colgate	Furman (1–0) (2)	Villanova (2–0)	Stephen F. Austin (3–0) (1)	Stephen F. Austin (4–0) (4)	Stephen F. Austin (4–0) (5)	Montana (5–1)	Wofford (5–1)	Cal Poly (7–0) (1)	Western Kentucky (6–2)	Western Kentucky (7–2)	New Hampshire (8–2)	New Hampshire (9–2)	Furman (10–3)	5.
6.	Northern Iowa (2)	McNeese State (1–0)	Delaware (1–1)	Western Kentucky (2–1) (1)	Western Kentucky (2–1) (1)	Western Kentucky (3–1) (1)	Wofford (4–1)	Cal Poly (6–0) (1)	Furman (6–2)	Delaware (6–2)	Georgia Southern (8–2)	William & Mary (8–2)	William & Mary (9–2)	New Hampshire (10–3)	6.
7.	Furman (1)	Delaware (0–1) (2)	Northern Iowa (1–1) (1)	Montana (2–1)	Montana (3–1)	Montana (4–1)	New Hampshire (4–1)	Furman (5–2)	Western Kentucky (5–2)	James Madison (7–1) (1)	New Hampshire (7–2)	Montana (8–2)	Montana (9–2)	Delaware (9–4)	7.
8.	McNeese State	Villanova (1–0)	Georgia Southern (1–1)	Maine (2–1) (2)	Maine (2–1) (2)	Wofford (3–1)	Furman (4–2)	Stephen F. Austin (5–1)	Sam Houston State (6–1)	New Hampshire (6–2)	Lehigh (8–1)	Lehigh (9–1)	James Madison (9–2)	Eastern Washington (9–4)	8.
9.	Villanova	Northern Iowa (0–1)	UMass (2–0) (1)	Wofford (1–1)	Wofford (2–1)	New Hampshire (4–1)	Cal Poly (5–0)	Northwestern State (5–1)	James Madison (6–1) (1)	Lehigh (7–1)	Montana (7–2)	James Madison (8–2)	Sam Houston State (9–2)	Southern Illinois (10–2)	9.
10.	Georgia Southern	Georgia Southern (0–1)	New Hampshire (2–0) (5)	Colgate (1–1)	Villanova (3–1)	Cal Poly (4–0)	Stephen F. Austin (4–1)	Western Kentucky (4–2)	New Hampshire (5–2)	Montana (6–2)	William & Mary (7–2)	Sam Houston State (8–2)	Delaware (8–3)	Georgia Southern (9–3)	10.
11.	Maine	Western Kentucky (0–1)	Western Kentucky (1–1)	Villanova (2–1)	Colgate (2–1)	Northwestern State (4–1)	Northwestern State (4–1)	Sam Houston State (5–1)	Wofford (5–2)	Cal Poly (7–1)	Delaware (6–3)	Delaware (7–3)	Hampton (10–1)	Western Kentucky (9–3)	11.
12.	Western Illinois	Montana State (0–0)	Colgate (0–1)	McNeese State (2–1)	New Hampshire (3–1)	Maine (2–2)	Maine (3–2)	Jacksonville State (6–0)	Lehigh (6–1)	Wofford (6–2)	Wofford (7–2)	Hampton (9–1)	Harvard (10–0) (2)	Hampton (10–2)	12.
13.	Western Kentucky	Northern Arizona (0–1)	Stephen F. Austin (2–0)	Northern Iowa (1–2)	Cal Poly (3–0)	Sam Houston State (3–1)	Sam Houston State (4–1)	James Madison (5–1)	Stephen F. Austin (5–2)	William & Mary (6–2)	Hampton (8–1)	Harvard (9–0) (1)	Jacksonville State (9–1)	Harvard (10–0)	13.
14.	Northern Arizona	UMass (1–0)	Montana State (1–0)	New Hampshire (2–1)	Northwestern State (3–1)	Villanova (3–2)	Jacksonville State (5–0)	William & Mary (5–1) (1)	Hampton (7–1)	Hampton (7–1)	Jacksonville State (7–1)	Jacksonville State (8–1)	Eastern Washington (8–3)	Jacksonville State (9–2)	14.
15.	Montana State	Stephen F. Austin (1–0)	Maine (1–1)	Cal Poly (3–0)	Northern Iowa (1–2)	Jacksonville State (4–0)	Appalachian State (4–2)	New Hampshire (4–2)	Northwestern State (5–2)	Jacksonville State (6–1)	Harvard (8–0)	Eastern Washington (8–3)	Northwestern State (8–3)	Lehigh (9–3)	15.
16.	Stephen F. Austin	Western Illinois (0–1)	Western Illinois (1–1)	UMass (2–1)	Northeastern (2–1)	Northern Arizona (2–2)	William & Mary (4–1) (1)	Lehigh (5–1)	William & Mary (5–2)	Harvard (7–0)	Eastern Washington (7–3)	Northwestern State (7–3)	Lehigh (9–2)	Cal Poly (9–2)	16.
17.	Grambling State	Maine (0–1)	McNeese State (1–1)	Appalachian State (2–1)	Hampton (4–0) (2)	Lehigh (3–1)	James Madison (4–1)	Hampton (6–1)	Appalachian State (5–3)	Montana State (6–2)	Penn (7–1)	Wofford (7–3)	Cal Poly (9–2)	Northwestern State (8–4)	17.
18.	Northwestern State	Northeastern (1–0)	Northeastern (1–1)	Northeastern (1–1)	Sam Houston State (2–1)	William & Mary (4–1)	Lehigh (4–1)	Colgate (4–2)	Colgate (5–2)	Stephen F. Austin (5–3)	Cal Poly (7–2)	Cal Poly (8–2)	Wofford (8–3)	Wofford (8–3)	18.
19.	UMass (Note: In the actual printed polls, UMass was listed as Massachusetts)	New Hampshire (0–1)	Northern Arizona (0–2)	Northwestern State (2–1)	UMass (2–2)	James Madison (3–1)	Northeastern (3–2)	Maine (3–3)	Maine (4–3)	Villanova (6–3)	Northwestern State (6–3)	Alabama State (8–1)	Alabama State (8–1)	Lafayette (8–4)	19.
20.	Appalachian State	Eastern Kentucky (0–0)	Appalachian State (1–1)	Hampton (2–1)	Northern Arizona (1–2)	Colgate (2–2)	Colgate (3–2)	South Carolina State (5–1)	Jacksonville State (6–1)	Penn (6–1)	Alabama State (7–1)	Southern (8–2)	Southern (8–2)	Alabama State (10–2)	20.
21.	Eastern Kentucky	Northwestern State (0–1)	Northwestern State (1–1)	Montana State (1–1)	Lehigh (2–1)	Appalachian State (3–2)	UC Davis (5–0)	Penn (4–1)	Harvard (6–0)	Eastern Washington (6–3)	UC Davis (6–2)	Coastal Carolina (9–1)	Penn (8–2)	Penn (8–2)	21.
22.	Northeastern	Lehigh (1–0)	Cal Poly (2–0)	Penn (1–0)	Jacksonville State (3–0)	Northern Iowa (1–3)	Hampton (5–1)	Harvard (5–0)	Penn (5–1)	Northwestern State (5–3)	Colgate (6–3)	Penn (7–2)	Coastal Carolina (10–1)	South Carolina State (9–2)	22.
23.	Lehigh	Northern Colorado (0–1)	Penn (0–0)	Northern Arizona (0–2)	McNeese State (2–2)	Northeastern (2–2)	Eastern Washington (4–2)	Appalachian State (4–3)	Villanova (5–3)	UC Davis (6–2)	Montana State (6–3)	South Carolina State (8–2)	South Carolina State (9–2)	North Dakota State (8–3)	23.
24.	North Carolina A&T	Appalachian State (0–1)	Lehigh (1–1)	James Madison (3–0)	Appalachian State (2–2)	UC Davis (4–0)	Villanova (3–3)	Villanova (4–3)	Montana State (5–2)	Colgate (5–3)	Coastal Carolina (8–1)	North Dakota State (8–3)	North Dakota State (8–3)	Coastal Carolina (10–1)	24.
25.	Penn	Penn (0–0)	Southeastern Louisiana (1–1)	Lehigh (2–1)	James Madison (2–1)	Hampton (4–1)	Penn (3–1)	UC Davis (5–1)	Eastern Washington (5–3)	Alabama State (7–0)	Southern (7–3)	Northern Iowa (6–4)	Lafayette (8–3)	Northern Iowa (7–4)	25.
	Preseason	Week 1 Sept 7	Week 2 Sept 14	Week 3 Sept 21	Week 4 Sept 28	Week 5 Oct 5	Week 6 Oct 12	Week 7 Oct 19	Week 8 Oct 26	Week 9 Nov 2	Week 10 Nov 9	Week 11 Nov 16	Week 12 Nov 23	Week 13 Postseason	
		Dropped: 17 Grambling State; 24 North Carolina A&T	Dropped: 20 Eastern Kentucky; 23 Northern Colorado	Dropped: 16 Western Illinois; 25 Southeastern Louisiana	Dropped: 21 Montana State; 22 Penn	Dropped: 19 UMass; 23 McNeese State	Dropped: 16 Northern Arizona; 22 Northern Iowa	Dropped: 19 Northeastern; 23 Eastern Washington	Dropped: 20 South Carolina State; 25 UC Davis	Dropped: 17 Appalachian State; 19 Maine	Dropped: 18 Stephen F. Austin; 19 Villanova	Dropped: 21 UC Davis; 22 Colgate; 23 Montana State	Dropped: 25 Northern Iowa	Dropped: 20 Southern	
